= Shinohara Station =

Shinohara Station (篠原駅) is the name of two train stations in Japan:

- Shinohara Station (Kōchi)
- Shinohara Station (Shiga)
