= Monju-dōri Station =

Tram station in Kōchi, Kōchi Prefecture, Japan

Coordinates: 33°33′33″N 133°34′49″E

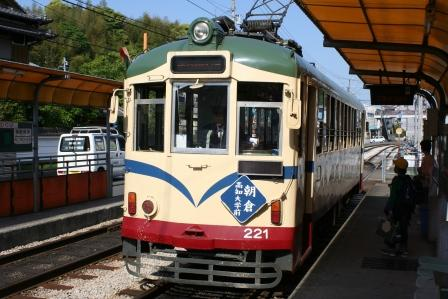
MOnju-dori

Monju-dōri Station (文珠通駅, Monju-dōri-eki) is a tram station in Kōchi, Japan.

== Lines ==
- Tosa Electric Railway
  - Gomen Line

== Adjacent stations ==
| « | Service | » |
Tosa Electric Railway
Gomen Line
| Kera-dōri | - | Takasu |
