= Shingi Station =

Tram station in Kōchi, Kōchi Prefecture, Japan

Coordinates: 33°33′44″N 133°35′12″E

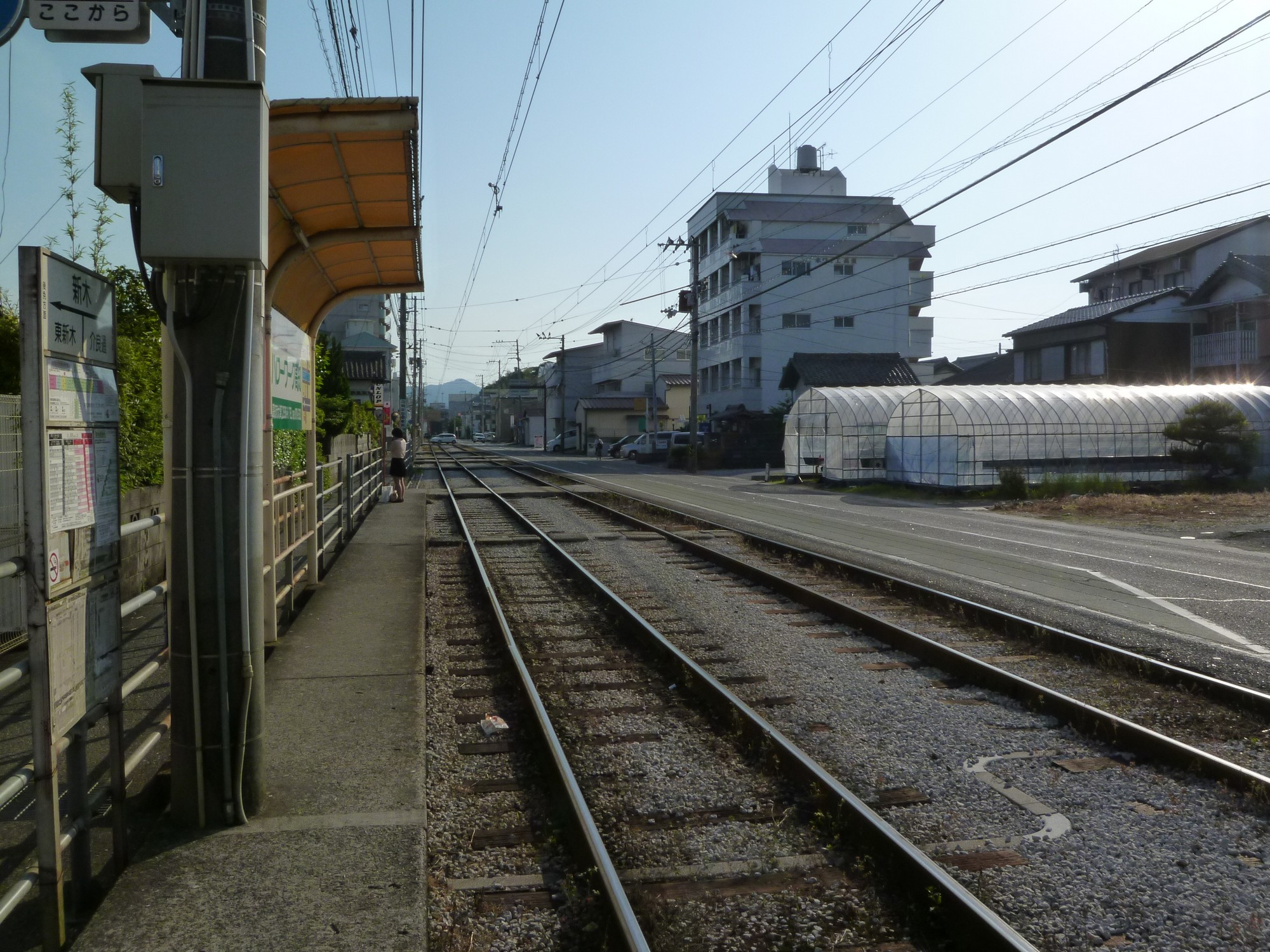
Shingi Station

Shingi Station (新木駅, Shingi-eki) is a tram station in Kōchi, Japan.

== Lines ==
- Tosa Electric Railway
  - Gomen Line

== Adjacent stations ==
| « | Service | » |
Tosa Electric Railway
Gomen Line
| Higashi-Shingi | - | Kera-dōri |
