= Higashi-Kōgyōmae Station =

Tram station in Nankoku, Kōchi Prefecture, Japan

Coordinates: 33°34′35″N 133°38′16″E

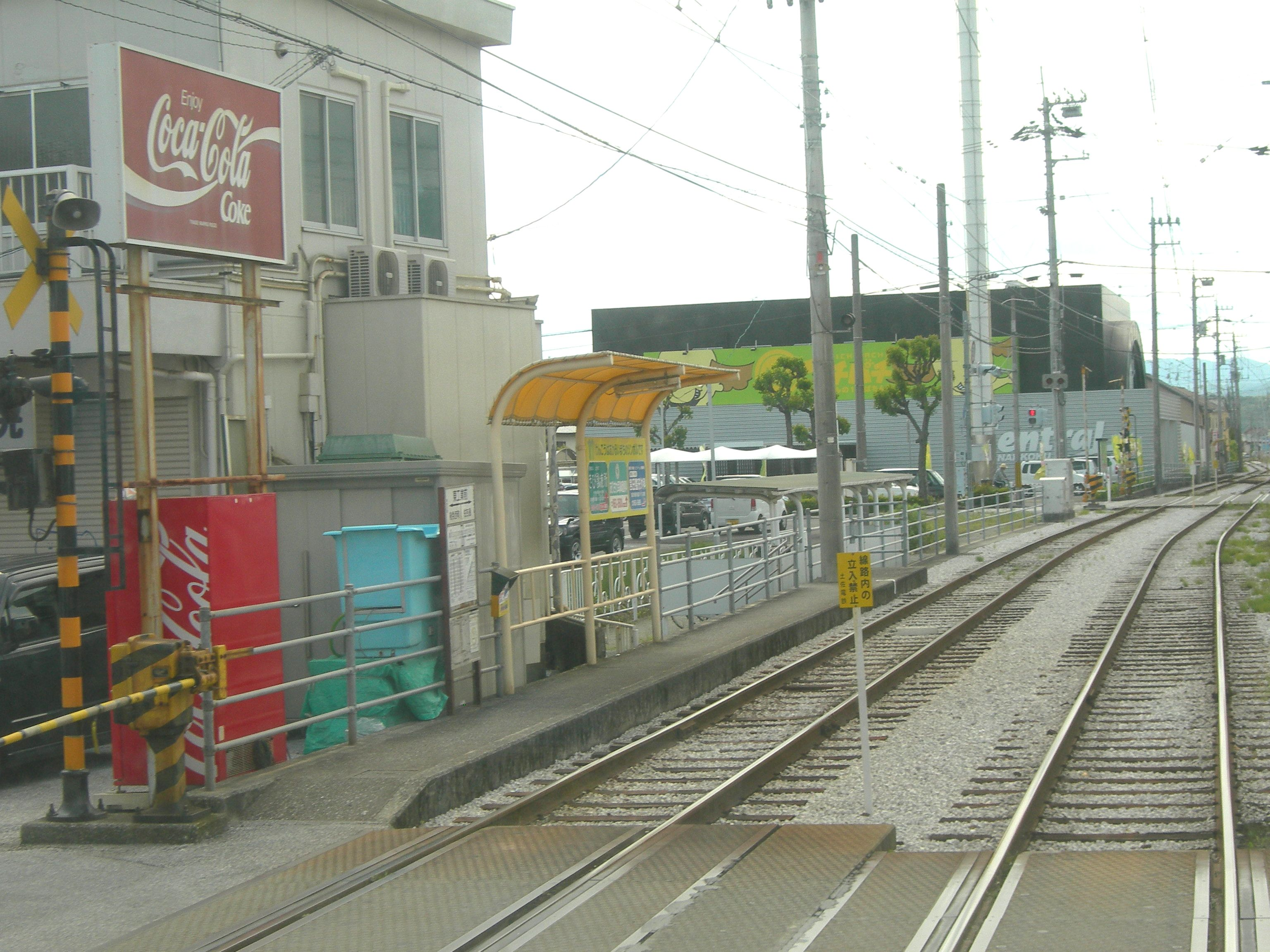
Station

Higashi-Kōgyōmae Station (東工業前駅, Higashi-Kōgyōmae-eki) is a tram station in Nankoku, Japan.

== Lines ==
- Tosa Electric Railway
  - Gomen Line

== Adjacent stations ==
«	Service	»
Tosa Electric Railway
Gomen Line
Gomen-nishimachi	-	Sumiyoshi-dōri
