= Nishi-Takasu Station =

Tram station in Kōchi, Kōchi Prefecture, Japan

Coordinates: 33°33′29″N 133°34′23″E

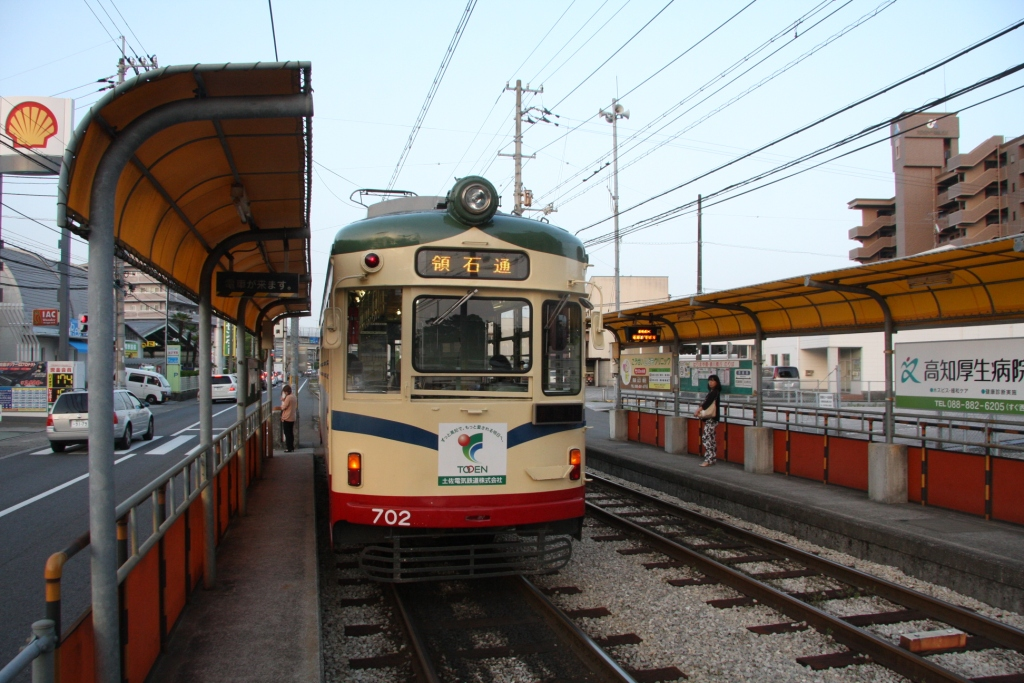
Train Stopping at Nishi-takasu Station

Nishi-Takasu Station (西高須駅, Nishi-Takasu-eki) is a tram station in Kōchi, Japan.

== Lines ==
- Tosa Electric Railway
  - Gomen Line

== Adjacent stations ==
| « | Service | » |
Tosa Electric Railway
Gomen Line
| Kenritsubijutsukan-dōri | - | Kazurashimabashi-higashizume |
