= Myōkenbashi Station =

Tram station in Kōchi, Kōchi Prefecture, Japan

Coordinates: 33°34′29″N 133°37′05″E

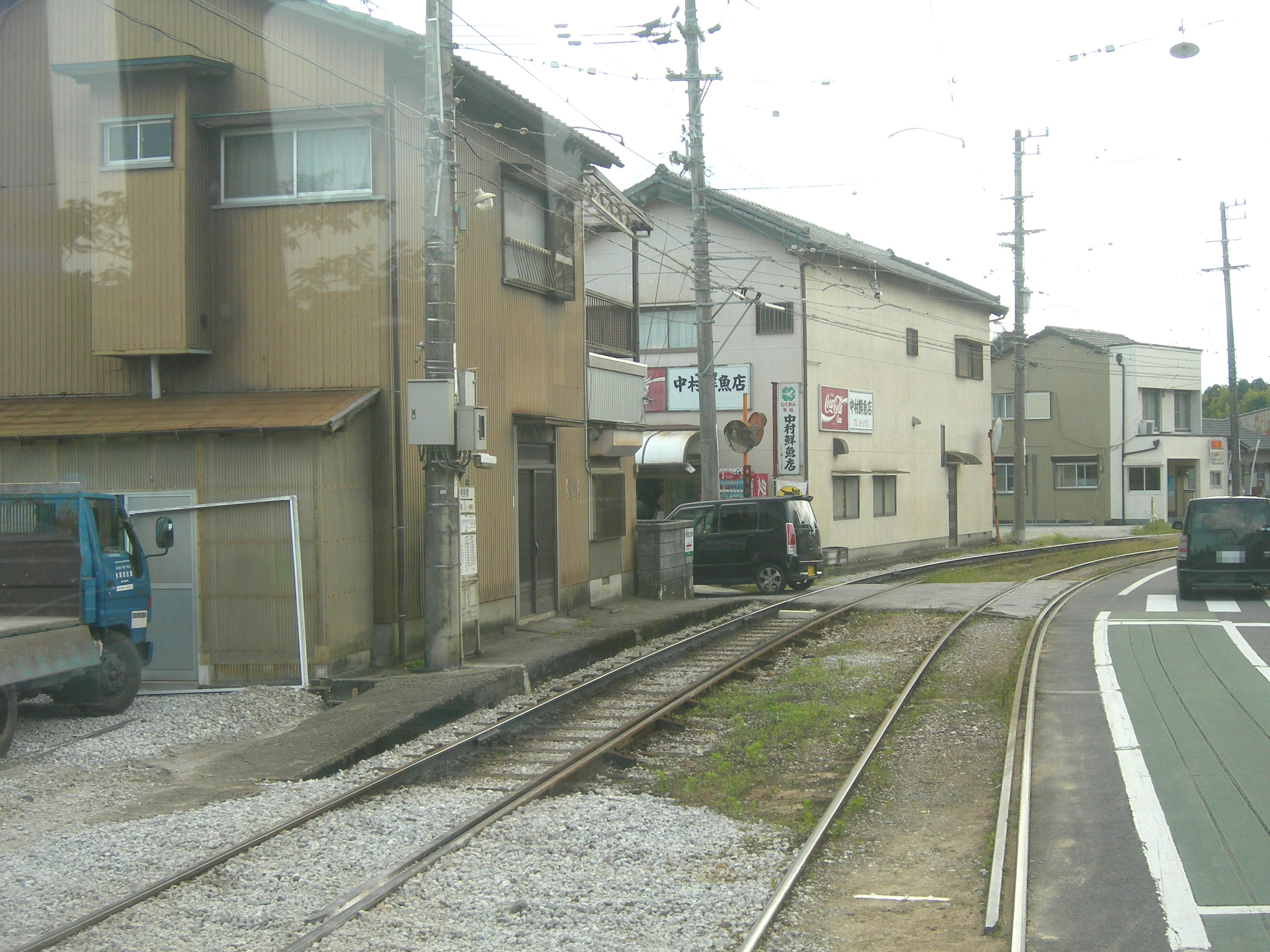
Station

Myōkenbashi Station (明見橋駅, Myōkenbashi-eki) is a tram station in Kōchi, Japan.

== Lines ==
- Tosa Electric Railway
  - Gomen Line

== Adjacent stations ==
«	Service	»
Tosa Electric Railway
Gomen Line
Nagasaki	-	Ichijōbashi
