= Chiyorichō Station =

Tram station in Kōchi, Kōchi Prefecture, Japan

Coordinates: 33°33′28″N 133°33′41″E

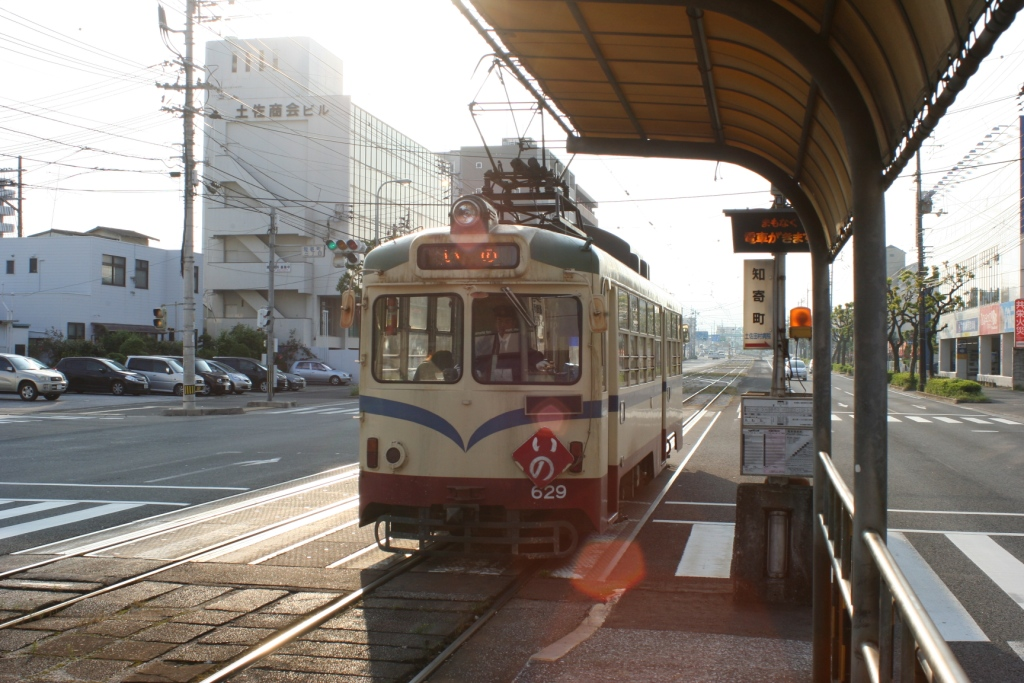
Chiyorichō Station

Chiyorichō Station (知寄町駅, Chiyorichō-eki) is a tram station in Kōchi, Kōchi Prefecture, Japan.

== Lines ==
- Tosa Electric Railway
  - Gomen Line

== Adjacent stations ==
| « | Service | » |
Tosa Electric Railway
Gomen Line
| Chiyorichō-sanchōme | - | Chiyorichō-nichōme |
