= Takasu Station (Kōchi) =

Tram station in Kōchi, Kōchi Prefecture, Japan

Coordinates: 33°33′33″N 133°34′38″E

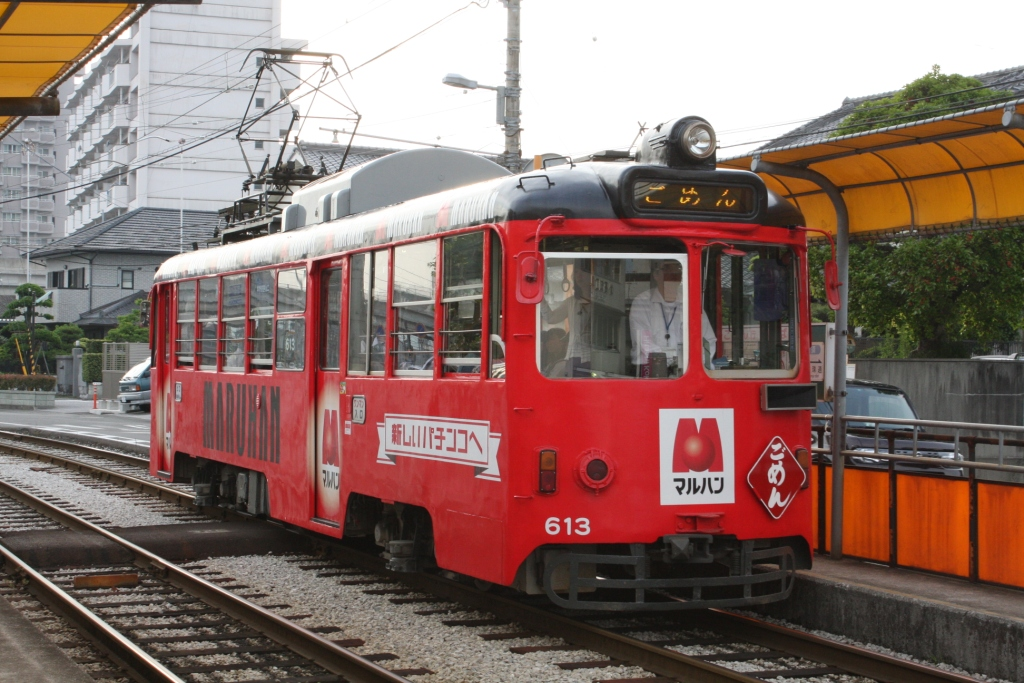
Tosu Electric Railway Gomen Line, Takasu Station

Takasu Station (高須駅, Takasu-eki) is a tram station in Kōchi, Japan.

== Lines ==
- Tosa Electric Railway
  - Gomen Line

== Adjacent stations ==
«	Service	»
Tosa Electric Railway
Gomen Line
Monju-dōri	-	Kenritsubijutsukan-dōri
