= Sumiyoshi-dōri Station =

Tram station in Nankoku, Kōchi Prefecture, Japan

Coordinates: 33°34′35″N 133°38′11″E

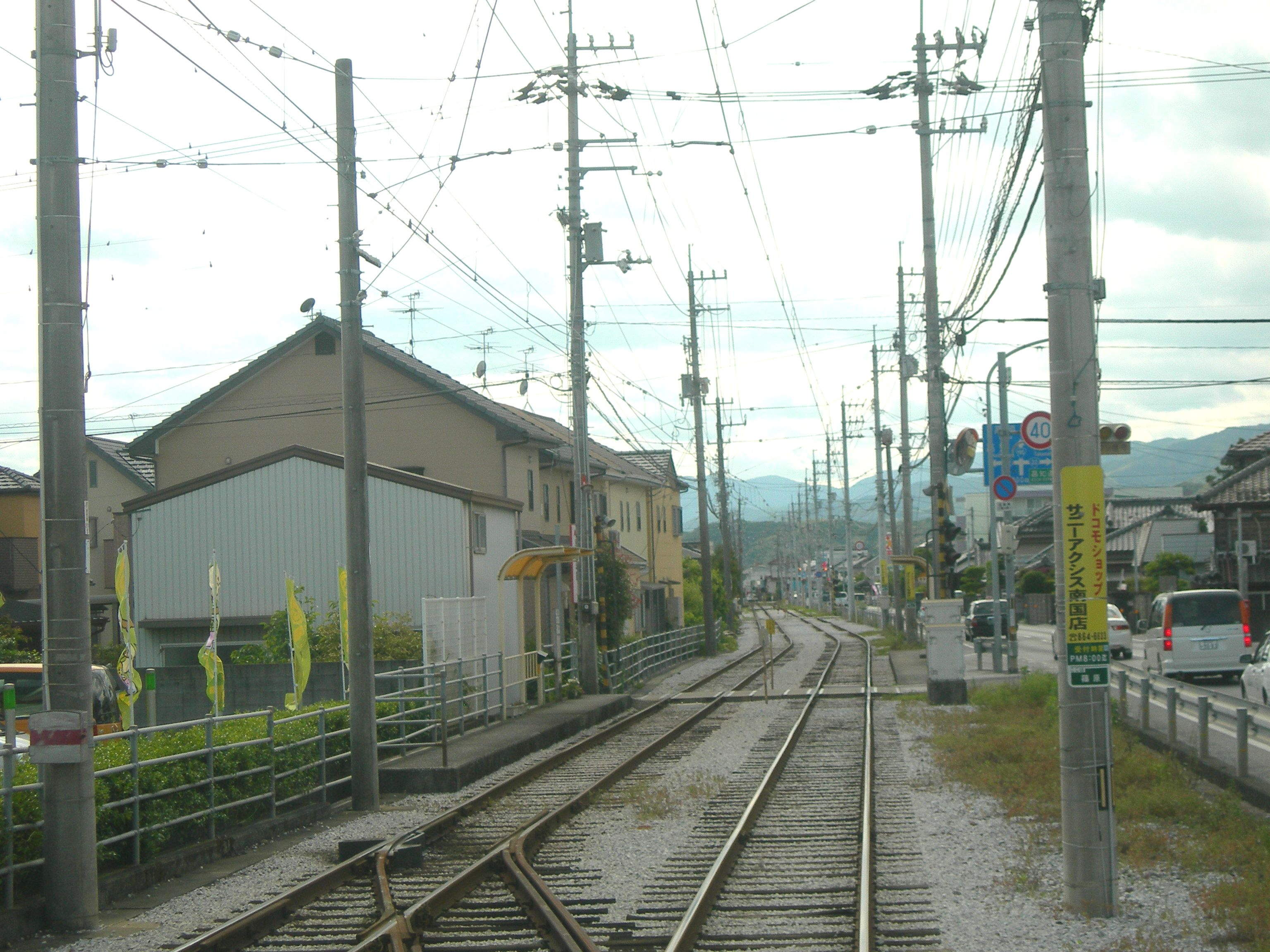
Station

Sumiyoshi-dōri Station (住吉通駅, Sumiyoshi-dōri-eki) is a tram station in Nankoku, Japan.

== Lines ==
- Tosa Electric Railway
  - Gomen Line

== Adjacent stations ==
| « | Service | » |
Tosa Electric Railway
Gomen Line
| Higashi-Kōgyōmae | - | Shinohara |
