= Kitaura Station (Kōchi) =

Tram station in Kōchi, Kōchi Prefecture, Japan

Coordinates: 33°34′23″N 133°36′13″E

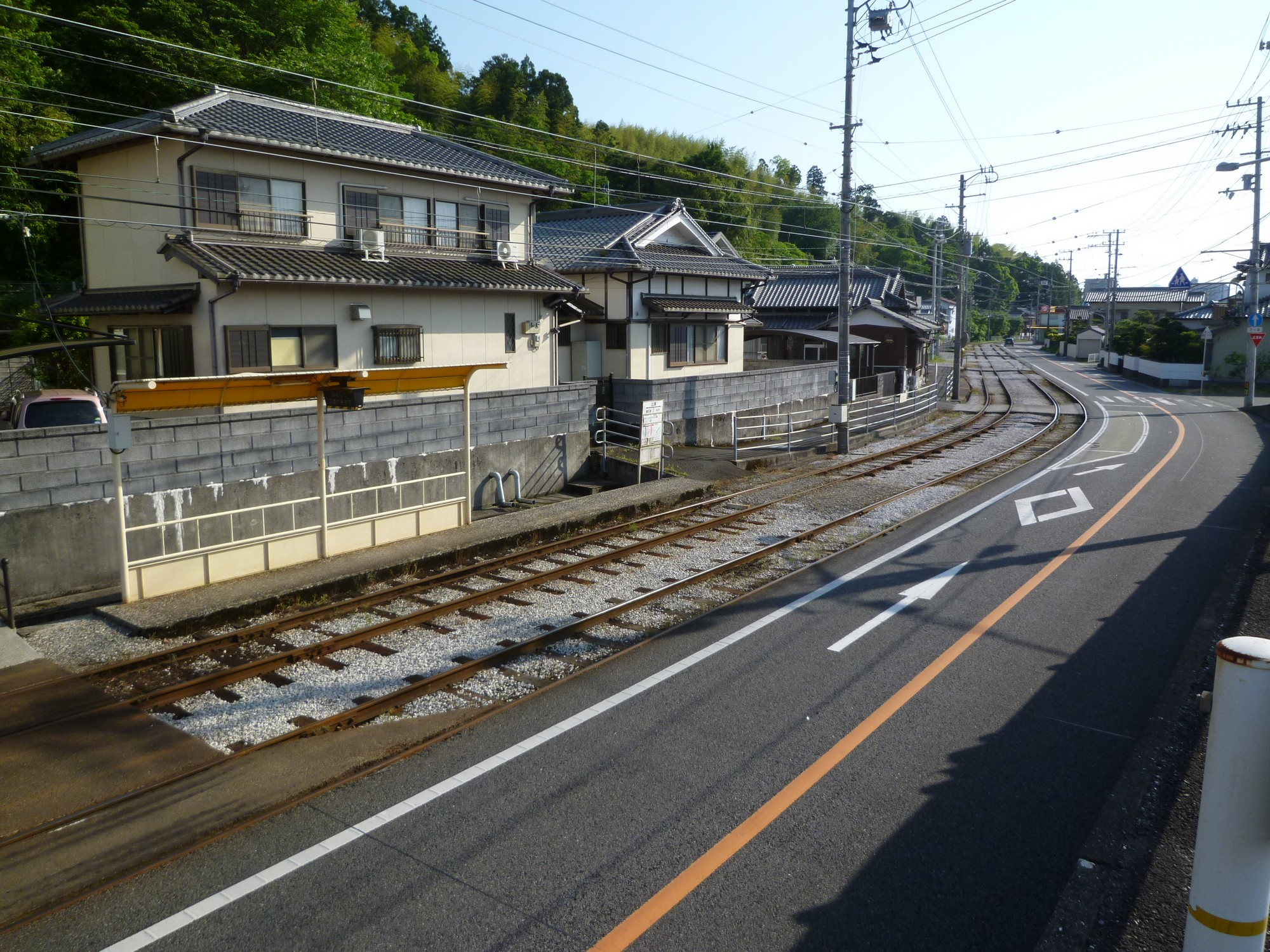
Kitaura railway

Kitaura Station (北浦停留場, Kitaura-teiryujo) is a tram station in Kōchi, Japan.

== Lines ==
- Tosa Electric Railway
  - Gomen Line

== Adjacent stations ==
«	Service	»
Tosa Electric Railway
Gomen Line
Ryōseki-dōri	-	Funato
