= Nagasaki Station (Kōchi) =

Tram station in Kōchi, Kōchi Prefecture, Japan

Coordinates: 33°34′30″N 133°37′16″E

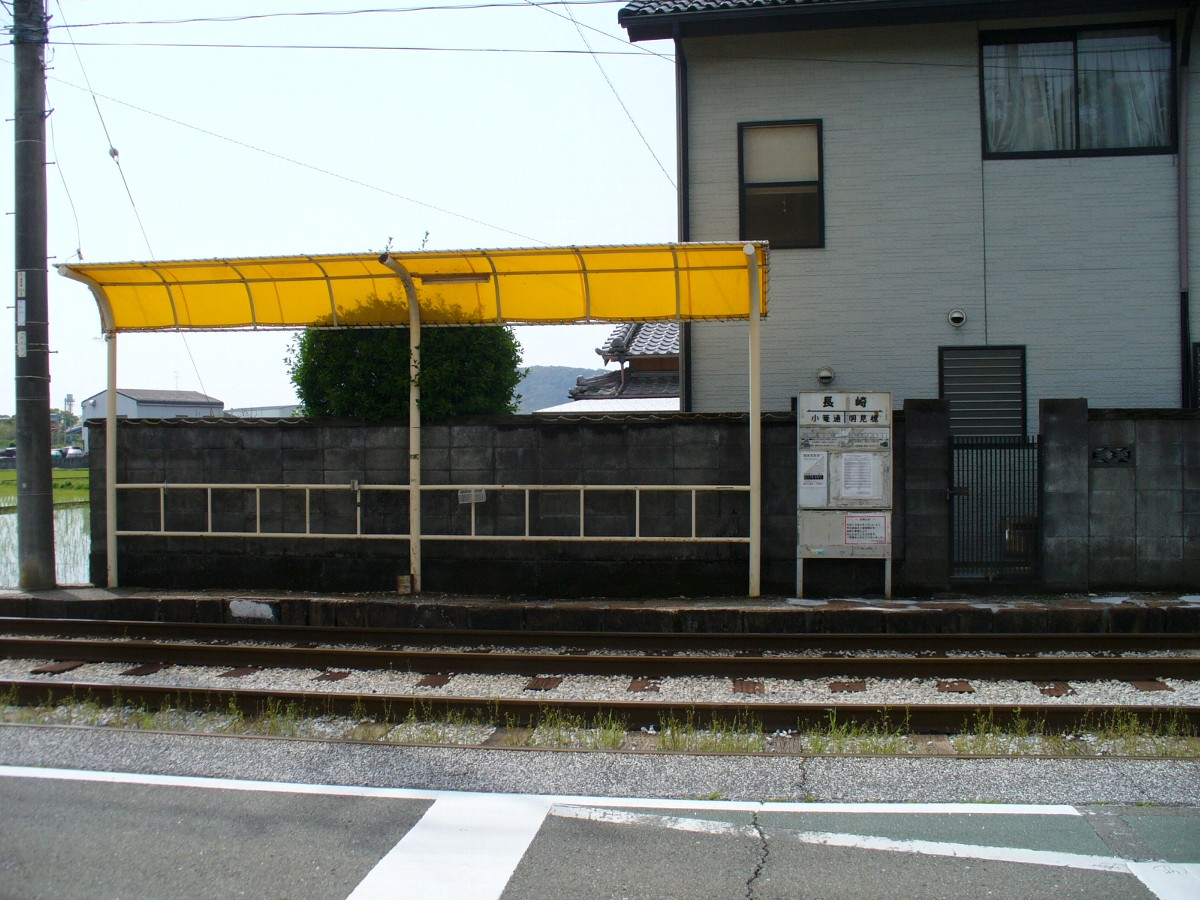
Station

Nagasaki Station (長崎駅, Nagasaki-eki) is a tram station in Kōchi, Japan.

== Lines ==
- Tosa Electric Railway
  - Gomen Line

== Adjacent stations ==
«	Service	»
Tosa Electric Railway
Gomen Line
Kogome-dōri	-	Myōkenbashi
