= Tosaden Kōtsū Gomen Line =

Gomen Line
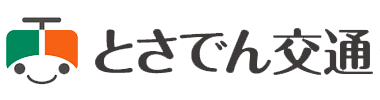

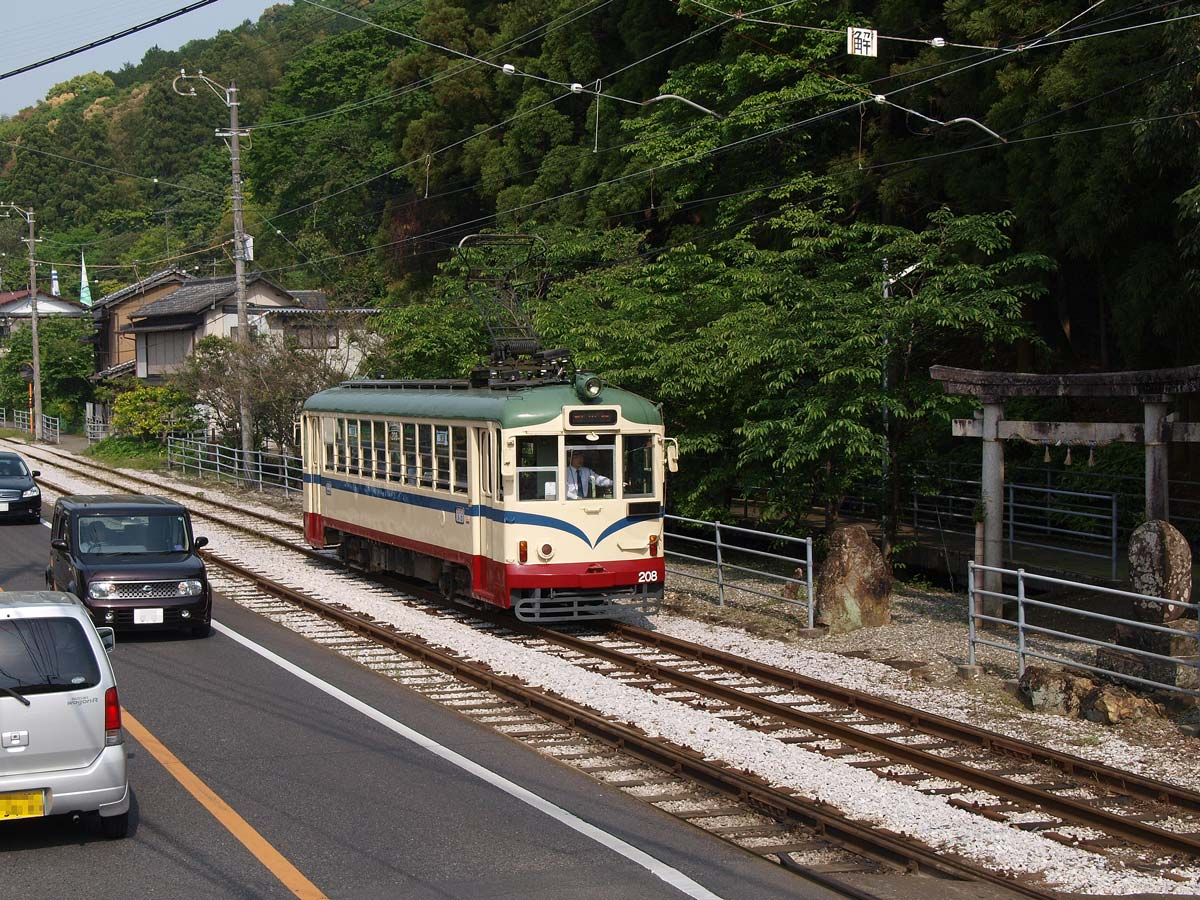
- Tram traveling parallel to National Route 195

Overview
- Locale: Kōchi
- Termini: Gomen-machi; Harimayabashi
- Stations: 33
- Website: Tosaden Kōtsū

Service
- Operator(s): Tosaden Kōtsū

History
- Opened: October 31, 1908

Technical
- Line length: 10.9 Km
- Track gauge: 1,067 mm (3 ft 6 in)
- Electrification: 600 V DC overhead

The Gomen Line (後免線, Gomen-sen) on the Tosaden Kōtsū network is a tram line serving the city of Kōchi on the island of Shikoku, Japan. Most tramcars directly continue onto the Ino Line; the two together are nicknamed the Tozai Line.

== Stations ==
Name		Distance (km)	Connections	Location	
Gomen-machi	後免町	0.00	Tosa Kuroshio Railway: Asa Line	Nankoku	Kōchi
Gomen-higashimachi	後免東町	0.26		Nankoku	Kōchi
Gomen-nakamachi	後免中町	0.52		Nankoku	Kōchi
Gomen-nishimachi	後免西町	0.79		Nankoku	Kōchi
Higashi-Kōgyōmae	東工業前	1.22		Nankoku	Kōchi
Sumiyoshi-dōri	住吉通	1.41		Nankoku	Kōchi
Shinohara	篠原	1.87		Nankoku	Kōchi
Kogome-dōri	小籠通	2.40		Nankoku	Kōchi
Nagasaki	長崎	2.88		Kōchi	Kōchi
Myōkenbashi	明見橋	3.10		Kōchi	Kōchi
Ichijōbashi	一条橋	3.55		Kōchi	Kōchi
Seiwagakuen-mae	清和学園前	3.61		Kōchi	Kōchi
Ryōseki-dōri	領石通	4.11		Kōchi	Kōchi
Kitaura	北浦	4.48		Kōchi	Kōchi
Funato	舟戸	5.04		Kōchi	Kōchi
Kako	鹿児	5.49		Kōchi	Kōchi
Tabeshima-dōri	田辺島通	5.90		Kōchi	Kōchi
Higashi-Shingi	東新木	6.25		Kōchi	Kōchi
Shingi	新木	6.61		Kōchi	Kōchi
Kera-dōri	介良通	7.06		Kōchi	Kōchi
Monju-dōri	文珠通	7.43		Kōchi	Kōchi
Takasu	高須	7.66		Kōchi	Kōchi
Kenritsubijutsukan-dōri	県立美術館通	7.85		Kōchi	Kōchi
Nishi-Takasu	西高須	8.03		Kōchi	Kōchi
Kazurashimabashi-higashizume	葛島橋東詰	8.43		Kōchi	Kōchi
Chiyorichō-sanchōme	知寄町三丁目	8.81		Kōchi	Kōchi
Chiyorichō	知寄町	9.13		Kōchi	Kōchi
Chiyorichō-nichōme	知寄町二丁目	9.31		Kōchi	Kōchi
Chiyorichō-itchōme	知寄町一丁目	9.61		Kōchi	Kōchi
Hōeichō	宝永町	9.89		Kōchi	Kōchi
Saenbachō	菜園場町	10.36		Kōchi	Kōchi
Dentetsu-Tāminarubiru-mae	デンテツターミナルビル前	10.82		Kōchi	Kōchi
Harimayabashi	はりまや橋	10.94	Tosaden Kōtsū: Ino Line, Sanbashi Line	Kōchi	Kōchi
