= Chiyorichō-itchōme Station =

Tram station in Kōchi, Kōchi Prefecture, Japan

Coordinates: 33°33′30″N 133°33′24″E

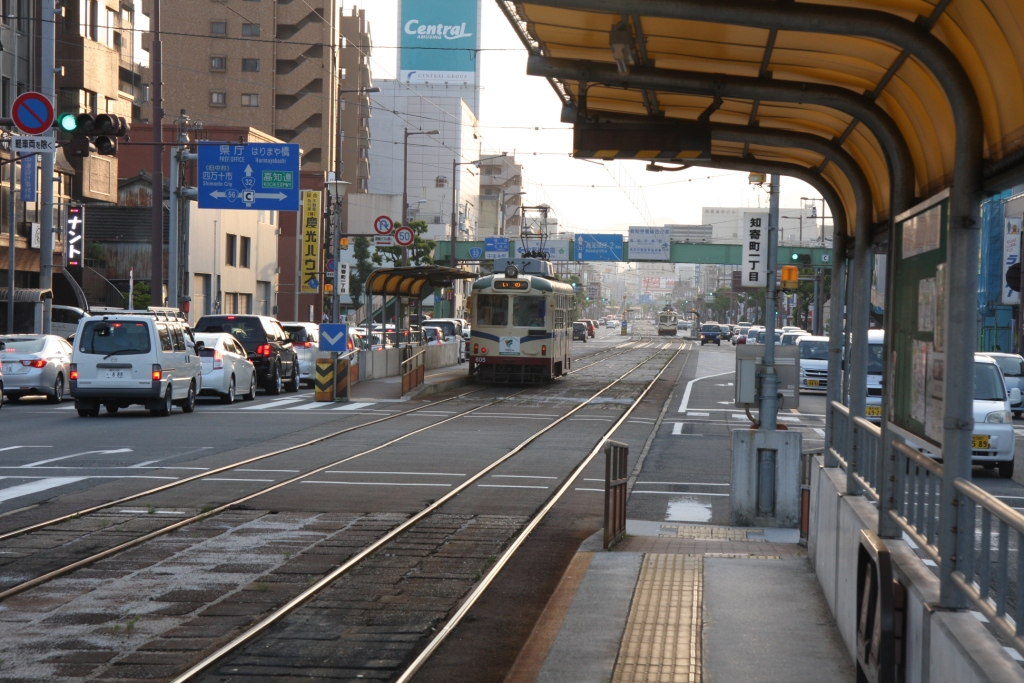

Chiyorichō-itchōme Station (知寄町一丁目駅, Chiyorichō-itchōme-eki) is a tram station in Kōchi, Kōchi Prefecture, Japan.

== Lines ==
- Tosa Electric Railway
  - Gomen Line

== Adjacent stations ==
| « | Service | » |
Tosa Electric Railway
Gomen Line
| Chiyorichō-nichōme | - | Hōeichō |
