= Kera-dōri Station =

Tram station in Kōchi, Kōchi Prefecture, Japan

Coordinates: 33°33′37″N 133°35′01″E

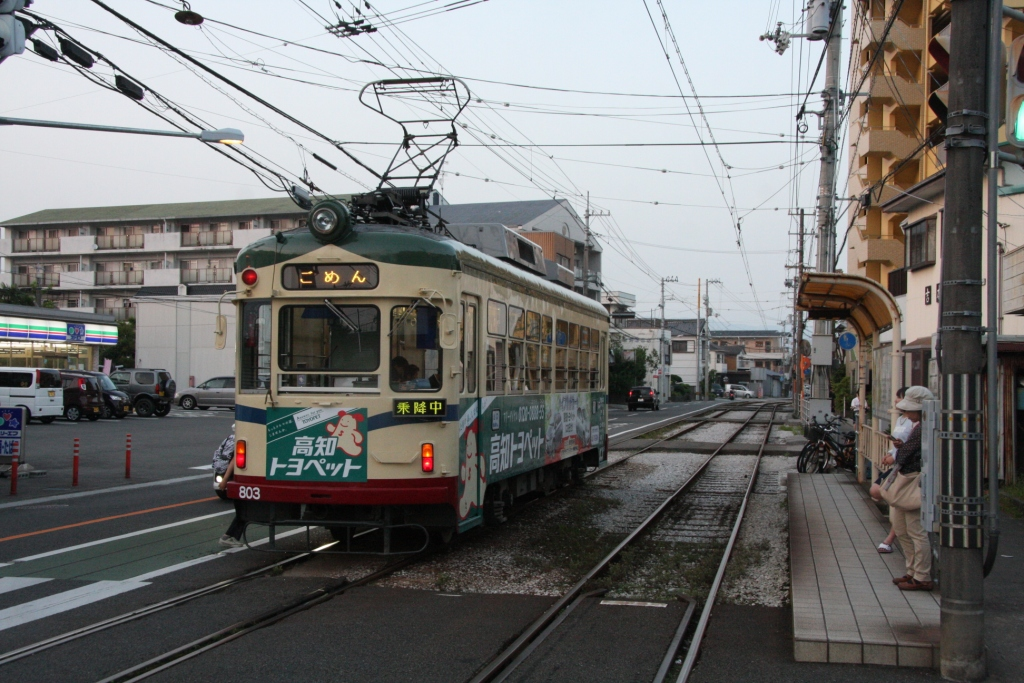
Kera-dōri Station

Kera-dōri Station (介良通駅, Kera-dōri-eki) is a tram station in Kōchi, Japan.

== Lines ==
- Tosa Electric Railway
  - Gomen Line

== Adjacent stations ==
«	Service	»
Tosa Electric Railway
Gomen Line
Shingi	-	Monju-dōri
