= Kogome-dōri Station =

Tram station in Nankoku, Kōchi Prefecture, Japan

Coordinates: 33°34′34″N 133°37′34″E

Kogome-dōri Station 小籠通駅
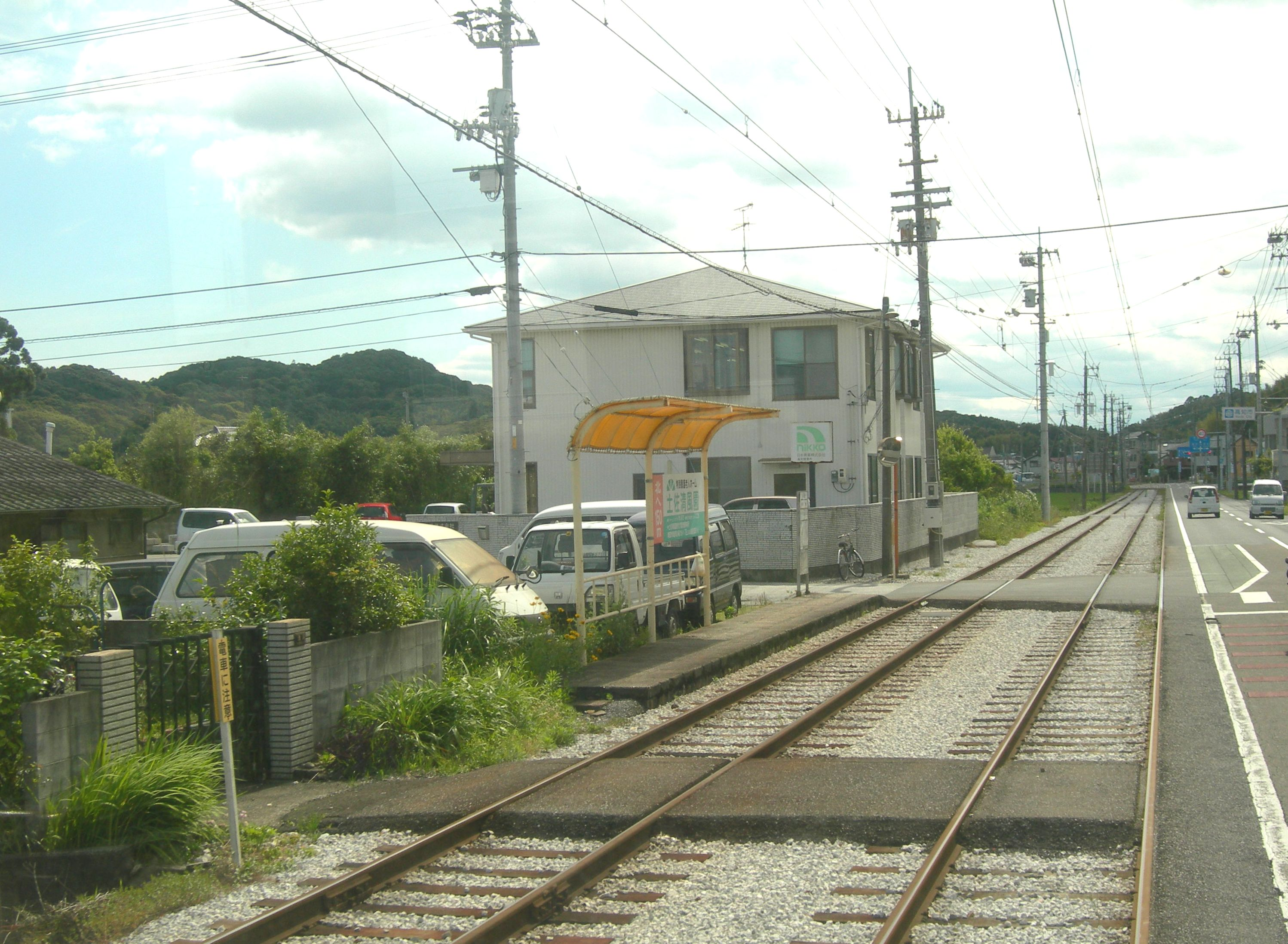

General information
- Location: Nankoku, Japan
- Line: Gomen Line
Location

Kogome-dōri Station (小籠通駅, Kogome-dōri-eki) is a tram station in Nankoku, Japan.

== Lines ==
- Tosa Electric Railway
  - Gomen Line

== Adjacent stations ==
| « | Service | » |
Tosa Electric Railway
Gomen Line
| Shinohara | - | Nagasaki |
