= Gomen-higashimachi Station =

Tram station in Nankoku, Kōchi Prefecture, Japan

Coordinates: 33°34′29″N 133°38′54″E

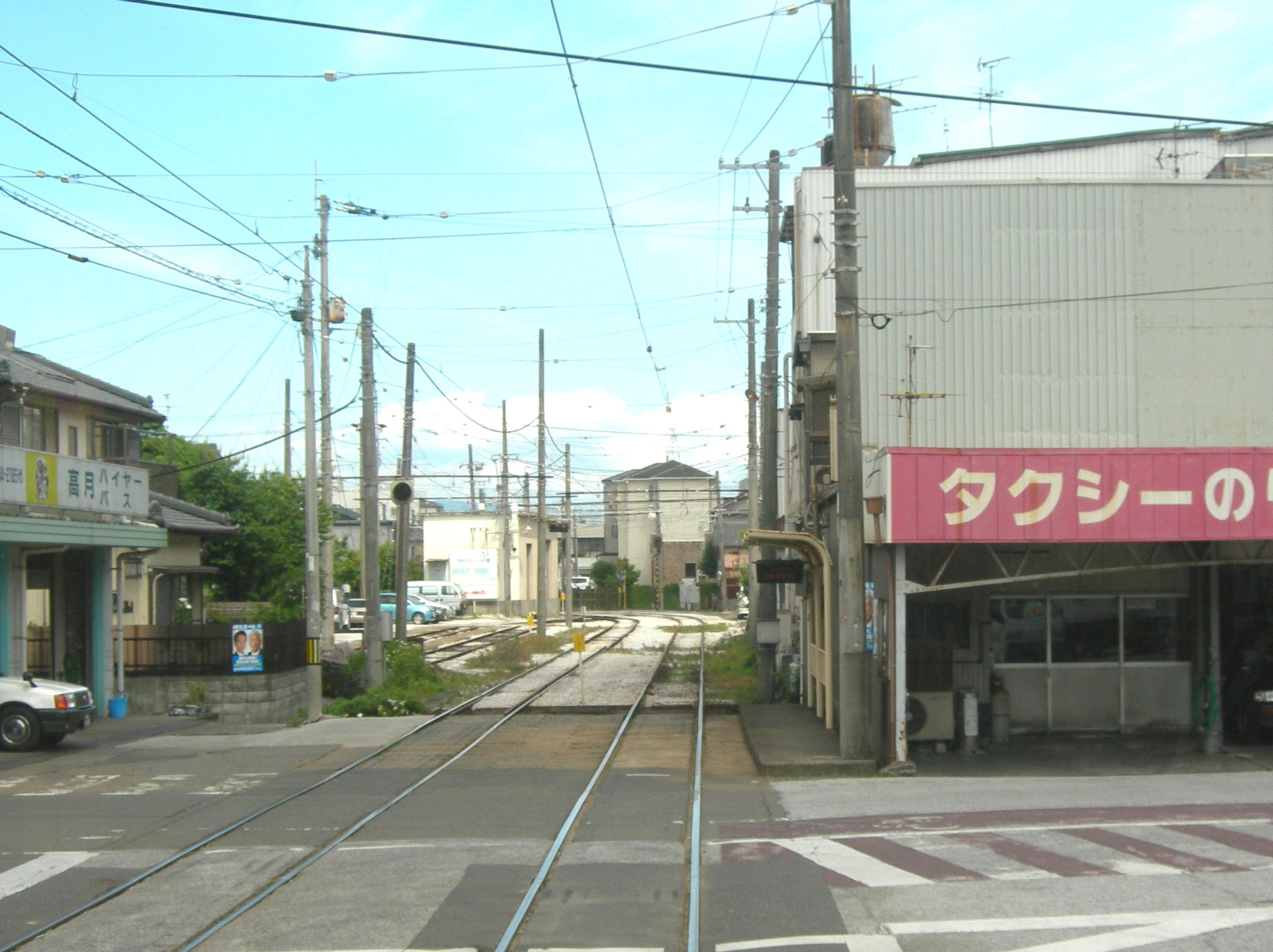
Station

Gomen-higashimachi Station (後免東町駅, Gomen-higashimachi-eki) is a tram station in Nankoku, Japan.

== Lines ==
- Tosa Electric Railway
  - Gomen Line

== Adjacent stations ==
«	Service	»
Tosa Electric Railway
Gomen Line
Gomenmachi	-	Gomen-nakamachi
