= Kenritsubijutsukan-dōri Station =

Tram station in Kōchi, Kōchi Prefecture, Japan

Coordinates: 33°33′32″N 133°34′32″E

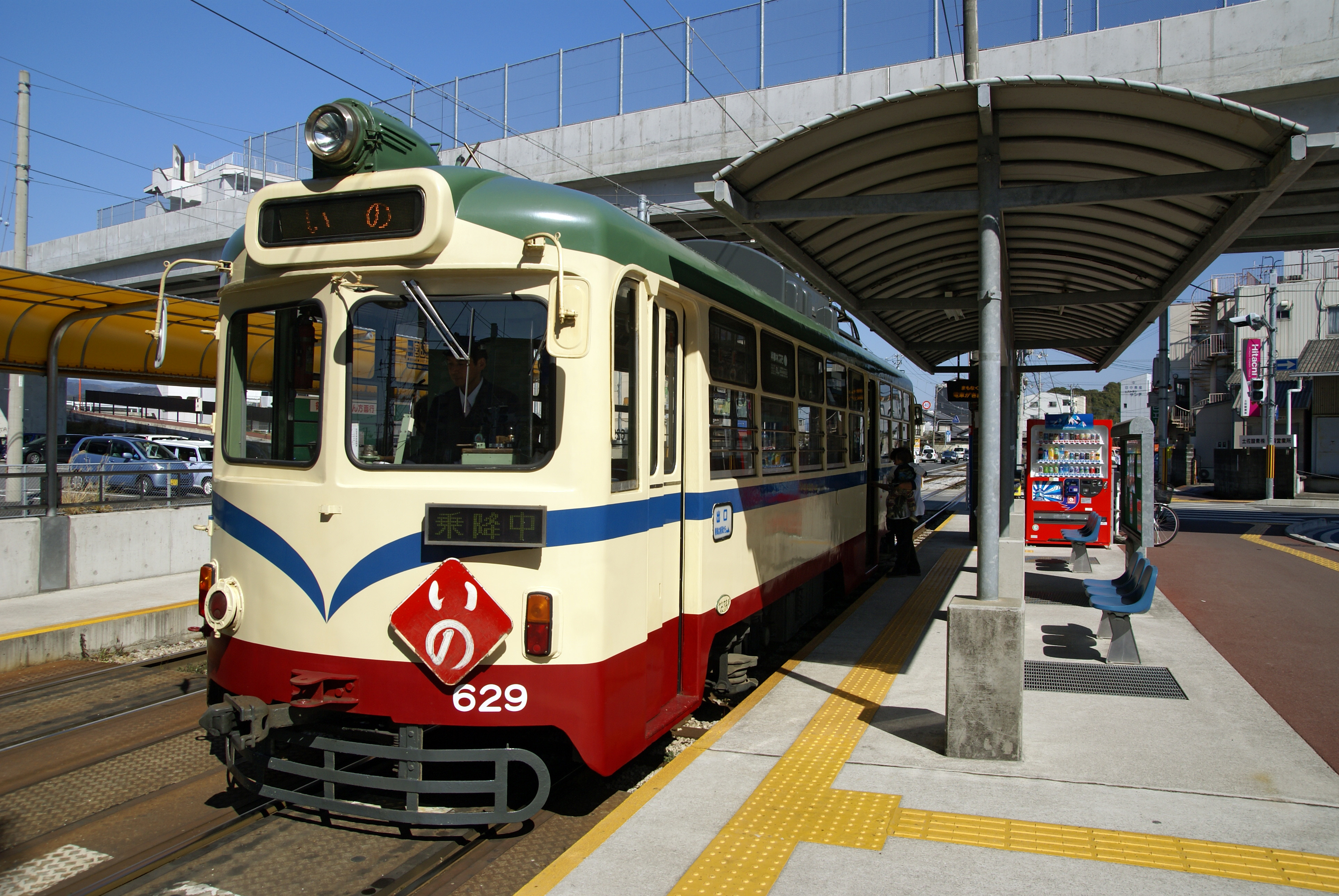
Station

Kenritsubijutsukan-dōri Station (県立美術館通駅, Kenritsubijutsukan-dōri-eki) is a tram station in Kōchi, Japan.

== Lines ==
- Tosa Electric Railway
  - Gomen Line

== Adjacent stations ==
| « | Service | » |
Tosa Electric Railway
Gomen Line
| Takasu | - | Nishi-Takasu |
