= Ryōseki-dōri Station =

Tram station in Kōchi, Kōchi Prefecture, Japan

Coordinates: 33°34′27″N 133°36′27″E

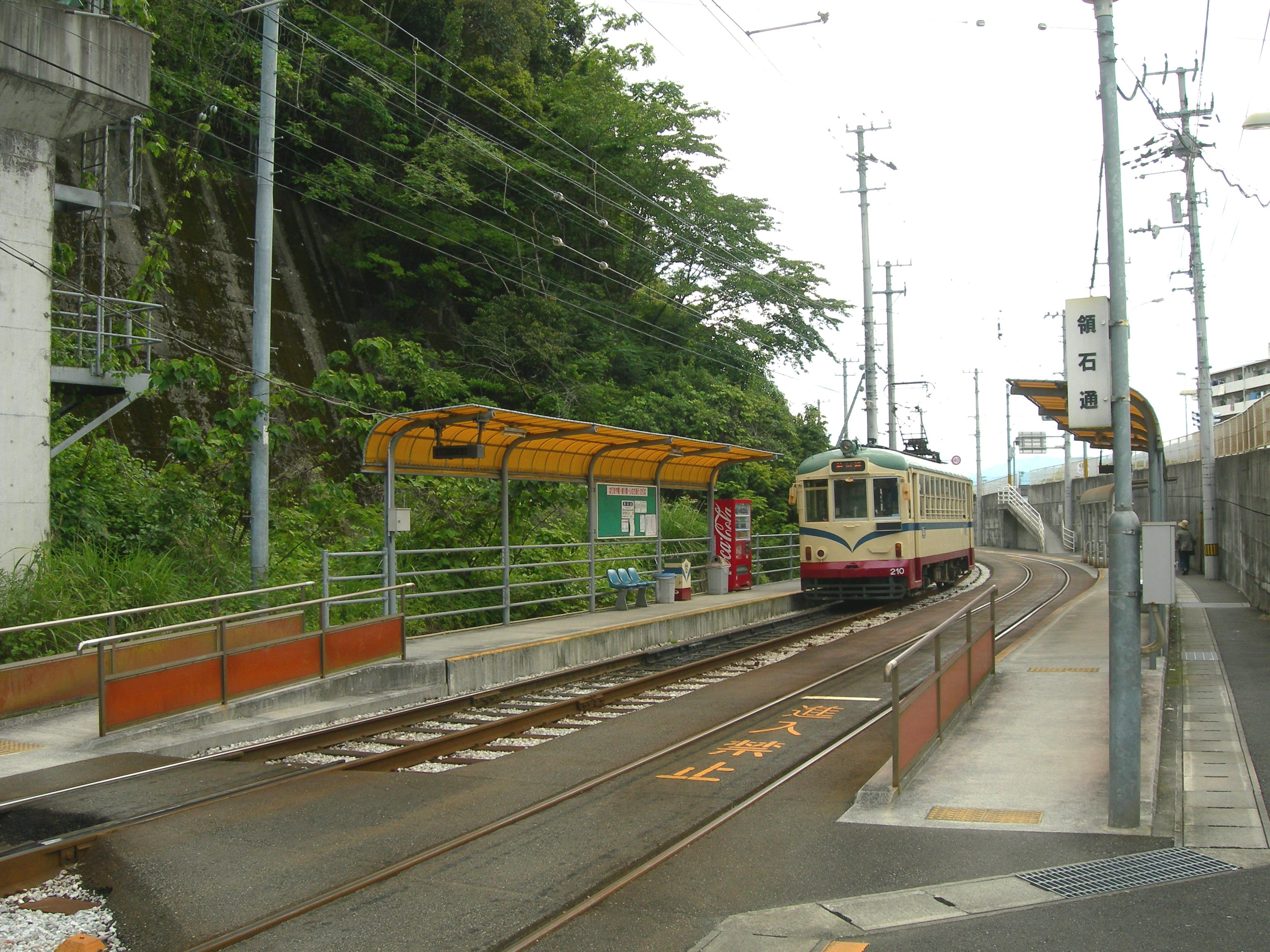
The station platforms in 2010

Ryōseki-dōri Station (領石通駅, Ryōseki-dōri-eki) is a tram station in Kōchi, Japan.

== Lines ==
- Tosa Electric Railway
  - Gomen Line

== Adjacent stations ==
«	Service	»
Tosa Electric Railway
Gomen Line
Seiwagakuen-mae	-	Kitaura
