= Tabeshima-dōri Station =

Tram station in Kōchi, Kōchi Prefecture, Japan

Coordinates: 33°33′58″N 133°35′34″E

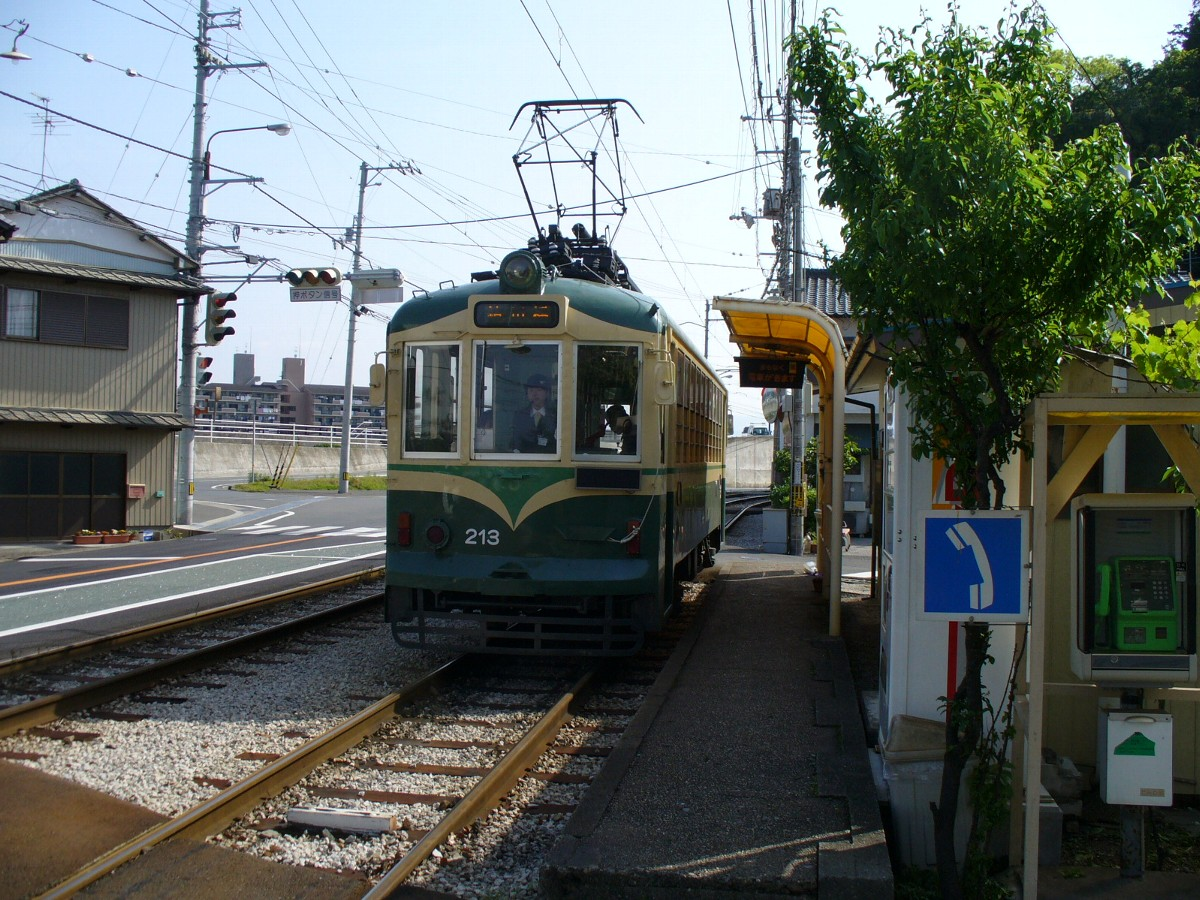
Station

Tabeshima-dōri Station (田辺島通駅, Tabeshima-dōri-eki) is a tram station in Kōchi, Japan.

== Lines ==
- Tosa Electric Railway
  - Gomen Line

== Adjacent stations ==
«	Service	»
Tosa Electric Railway
Gomen Line
Kako	-	Higashi-Shingi
