= Higashi-Shingi Station =

Tram station in Kōchi, Kōchi Prefecture, Japan

Coordinates: 33°33′51″N 133°35′23″E

Higashi-Shingi Station 東新木駅
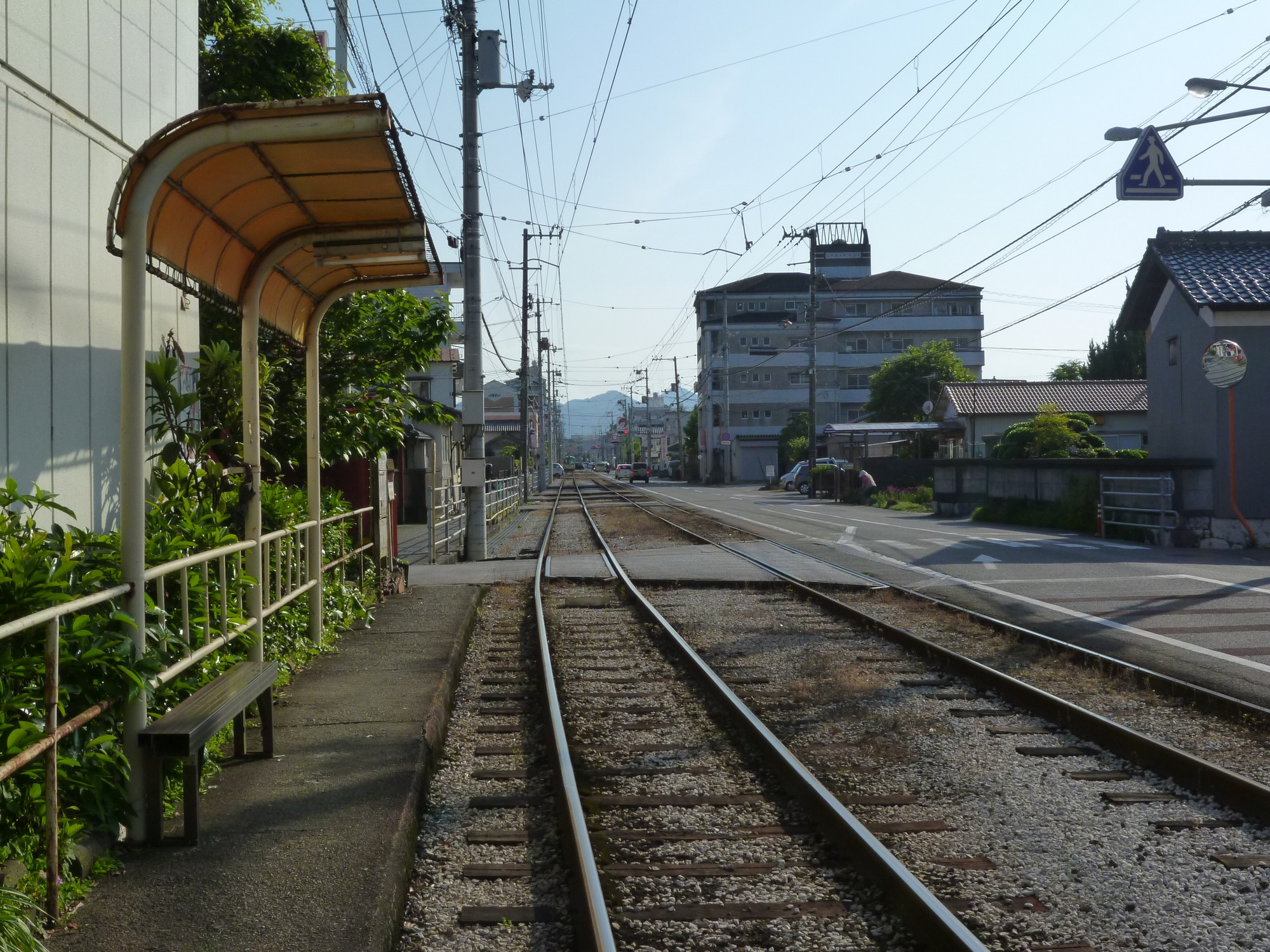

General information
- Location: Kōchi, Japan
- Transit authority: Tosaden Kōtsū
- Line: Gomen Line
Location

Higashi-Shingi Station (東新木駅, Higashi-Shingi-eki) is a tram station in Kōchi, Japan.

== Lines ==
- Tosa Electric Railway
  - Gomen Line

== Adjacent stations ==
«	Service	»
Tosa Electric Railway
Gomen Line
Tabeshima-dōri	-	Shingi
