= Kazurashimabashi-higashizume Station =

Tram station in Kōchi, Kōchi Prefecture, Japan

Coordinates: 33°33′25″N 133°34′11″E

Kazurashimabashi-higashizume Station 葛島橋東詰駅
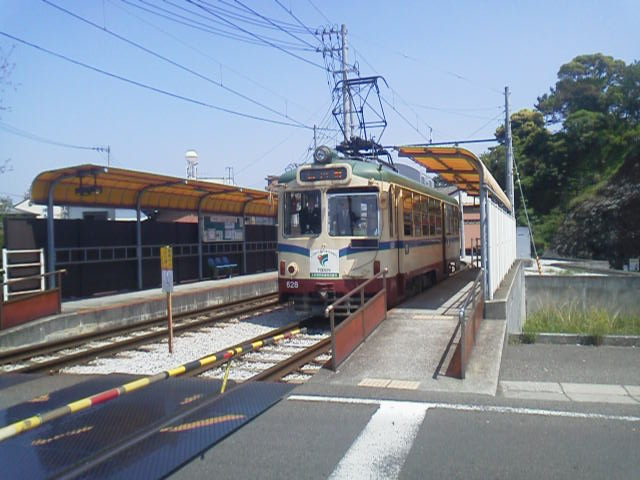

General information
- Location: Kōchi, Japan
- Line: Gomen Line
Location

Kazurashimabashi-higashizume Station (葛島橋東詰駅, Kazurashimabashi-higashizume-eki) is a tram station in Kōchi, Japan.

== Lines ==
- Tosa Electric Railway
  - Gomen Line

== Adjacent stations ==
«	Service	»
Tosa Electric Railway
Gomen Line
Nishi-Takasu	-	Chiyorichō-sanchōme
