= Saenbachō Station =

Tram station in Kōchi, Kōchi Prefecture, Japan

Coordinates: 33°33′32″N 133°32′55″E

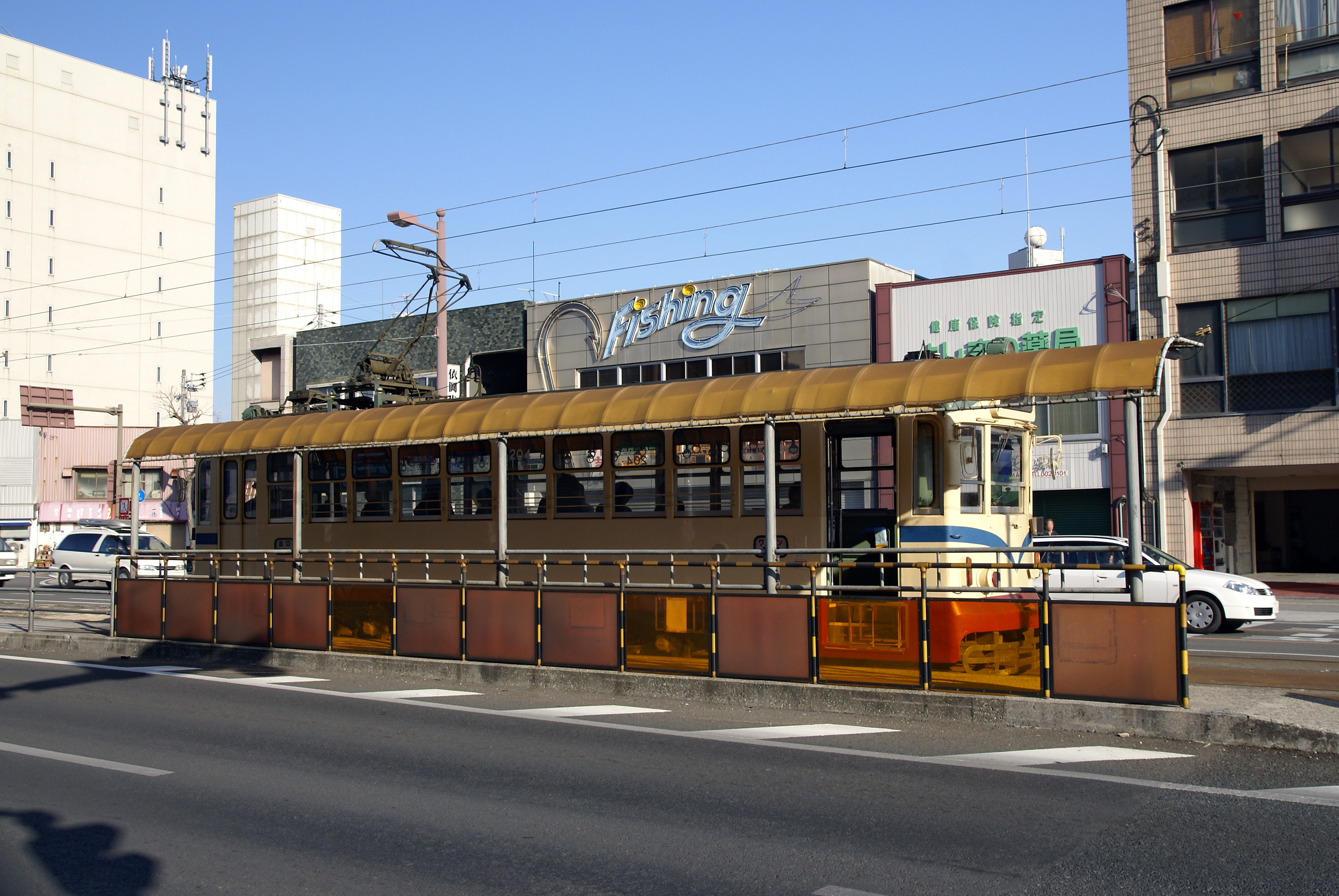
Station

Saenbachō Station (菜園場町駅, Saenbachō-eki) is a tram station in Kōchi, Kōchi Prefecture, Japan.

== Lines ==
- Tosa Electric Railway
  - Gomen Line

== Adjacent stations ==
«	Service	»
Tosa Electric Railway
Gomen Line
Hōeichō	-	Dentetsu-Tāminarubiru-mae
