= Nankoku =

Nankoku 南国市
- City
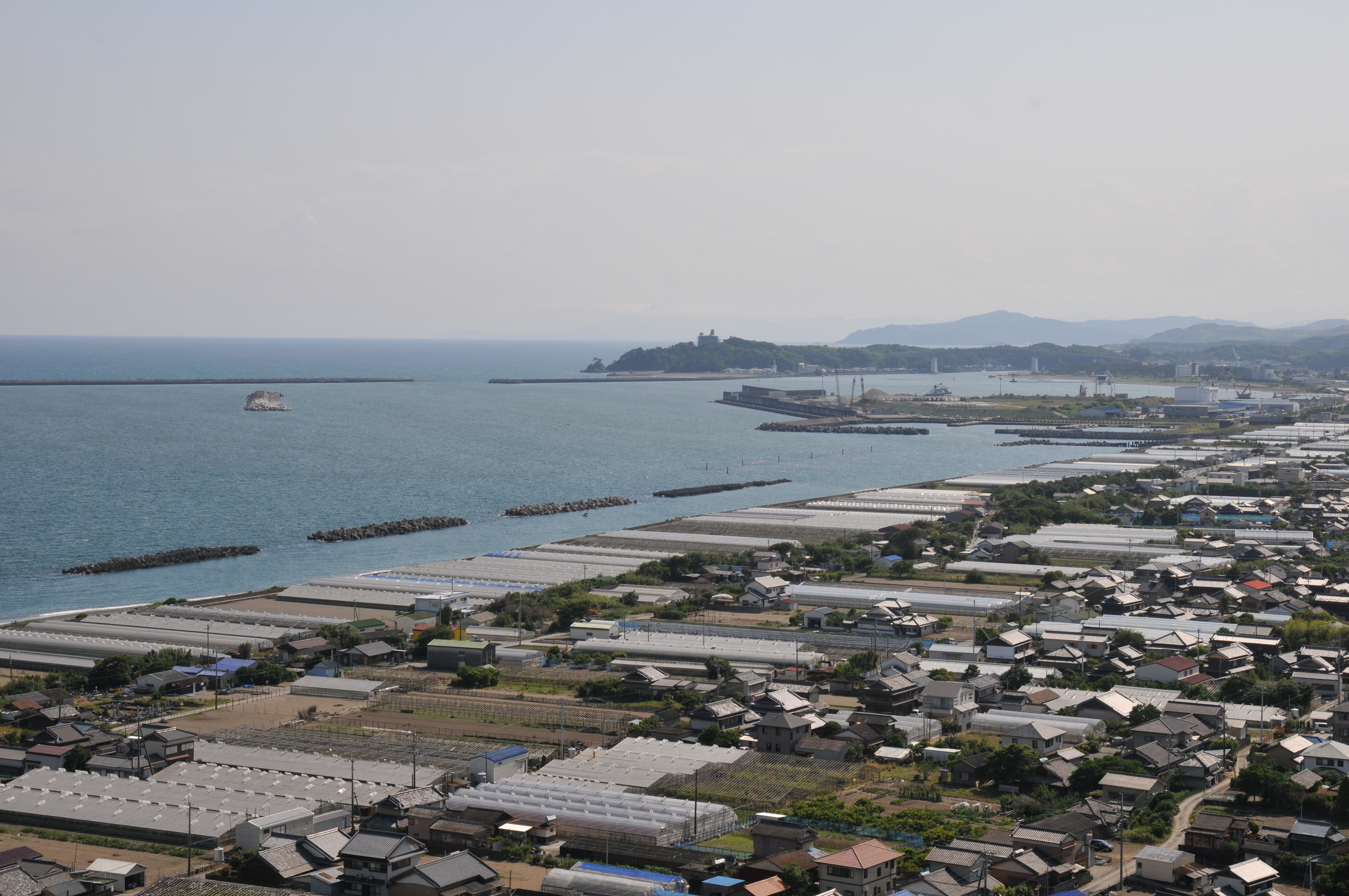
- View of Tosa Bay and Pacific Ocean from Zenjibu Temple

- Flag Seal
- /0/queryThe property query is required; /0/idsThe property ids is required; /0Failed to match at least one schema; /0/titleThe property title is required; /0/serviceDoes not have a value in the enumeration ["page"]; /0Failed to match exactly one schema; /0/geometriesThe property geometries is required; /0/typeDoes not have a value in the enumeration ["GeometryCollection"]; /0/typeDoes not have a value in the enumeration ["MultiPolygon"]; /0/typeDoes not have a value in the enumeration ["Point"]; /0/typeDoes not have a value in the enumeration ["MultiPoint"]; /0/typeDoes not have a value in the enumeration ["LineString"]; /0/typeDoes not have a value in the enumeration ["MultiLineString"]; /0/typeDoes not have a value in the enumeration ["Polygon"]; /0/coordinatesThe property coordinates is required; /0/geometryThe property geometry is required; /0/typeDoes not have a value in the enumeration ["Feature"]; /0/featuresThe property features is required; /0/typeDoes not have a value in the enumeration ["FeatureCollection"]; Location of Nankoku in Kōchi Prefecture

- Location in Japan
- Coordinates: 33°35′N 133°38′E
- Country: Japan
- Region: Shikoku
- Prefecture: Kōchi

Government
  - Mayor: Toshihito Hashizume

Area
  - Total: 125.30 km^{2} (48.38 sq mi)

Population (31 July 2021)
  - Total: 46,459
  - Density: 370.78/km^{2} (960.32/sq mi)
- Time zone: UTC+09:00 (JST)
- City hall address: 2301 Ōsone Kō, Nankoku-shi, Kōchi-ken 783-8501
- Climate: Cfa
- Website: Official website
- Symbols
- Bird: Onagadori (Long tail chicken)
- Flower: Tachibana (Citrus tachibana)
- Tree: Yamamomo

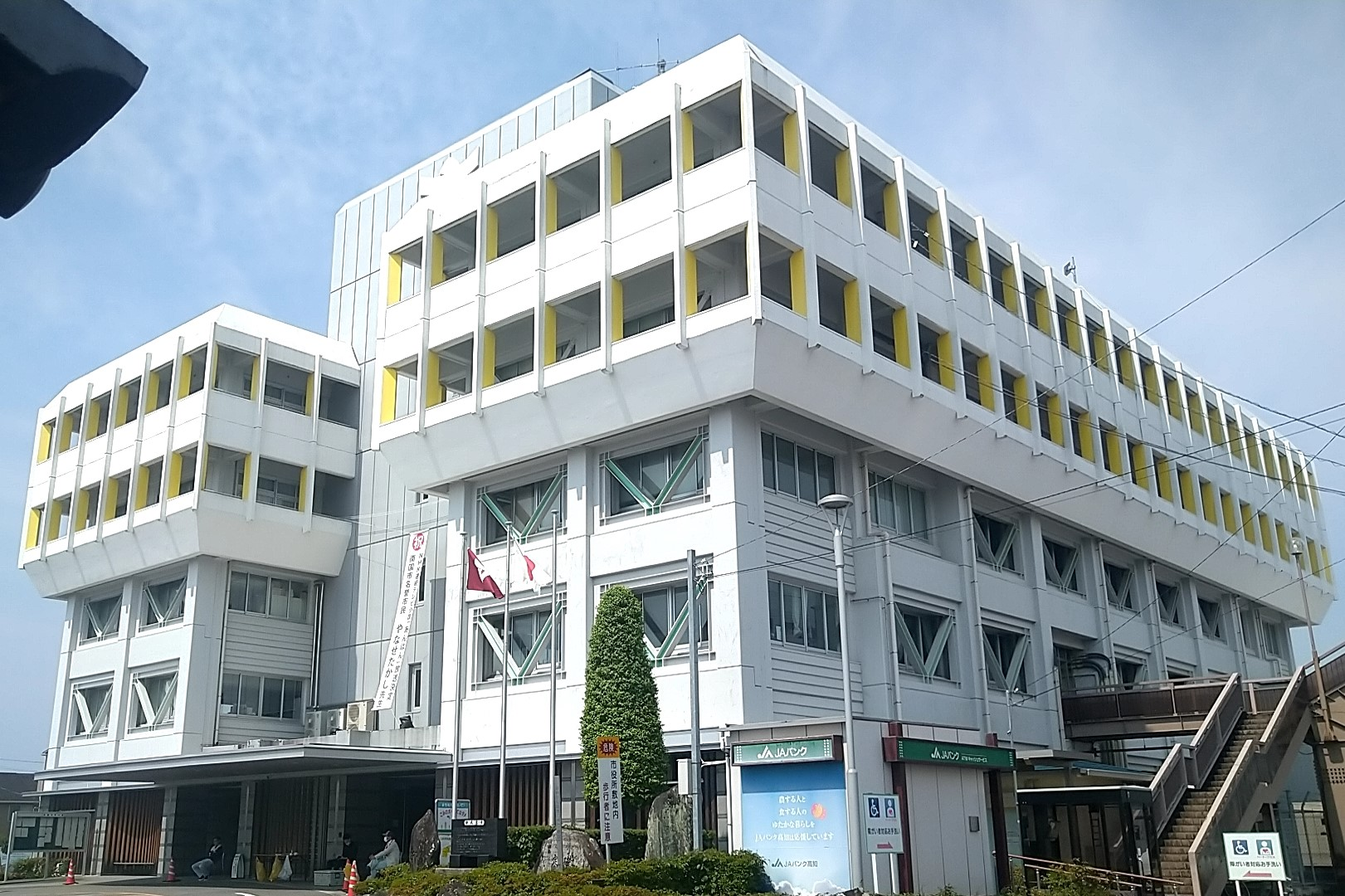
Nankoku City Hall

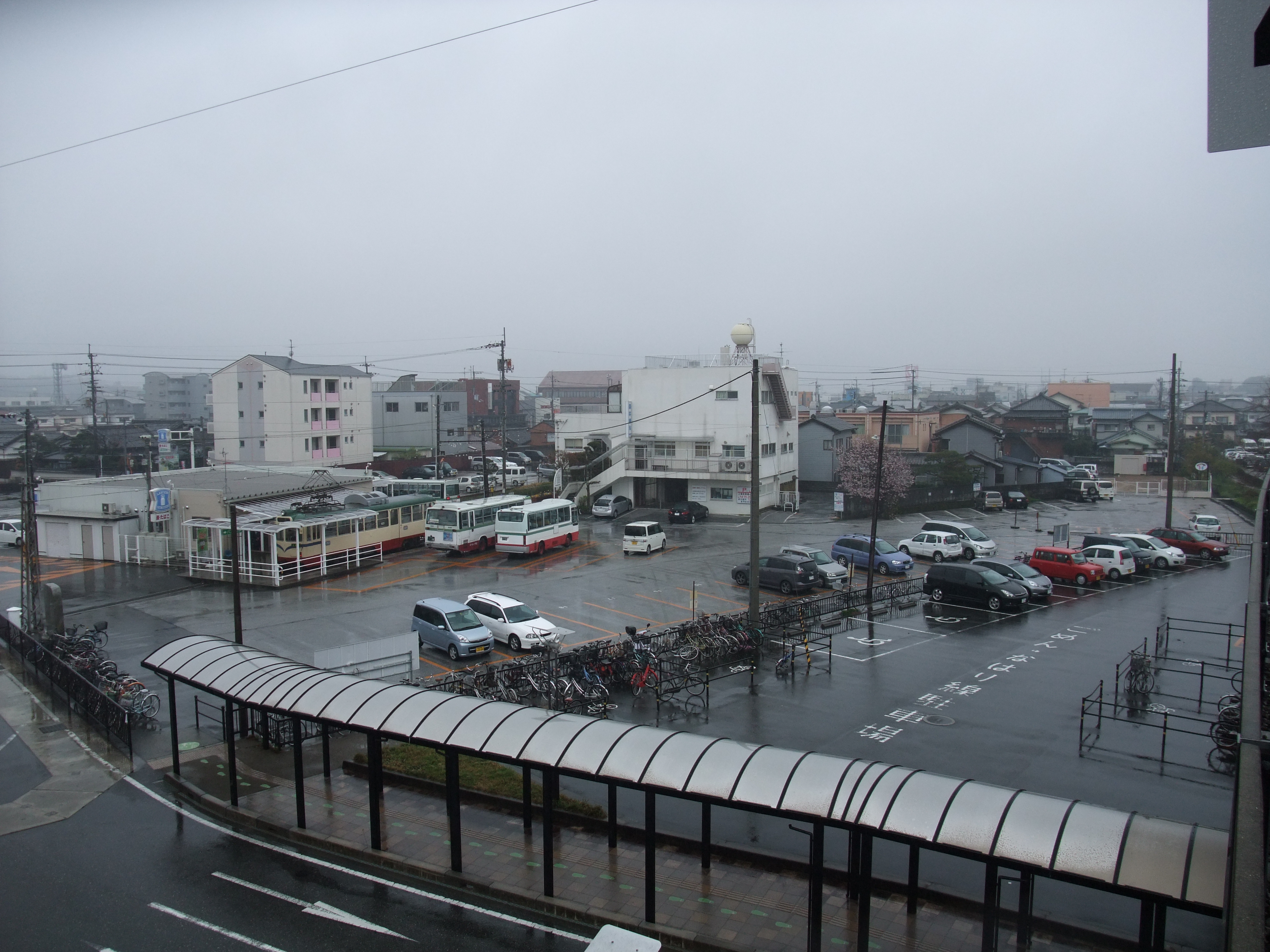
Downtown Nankoku

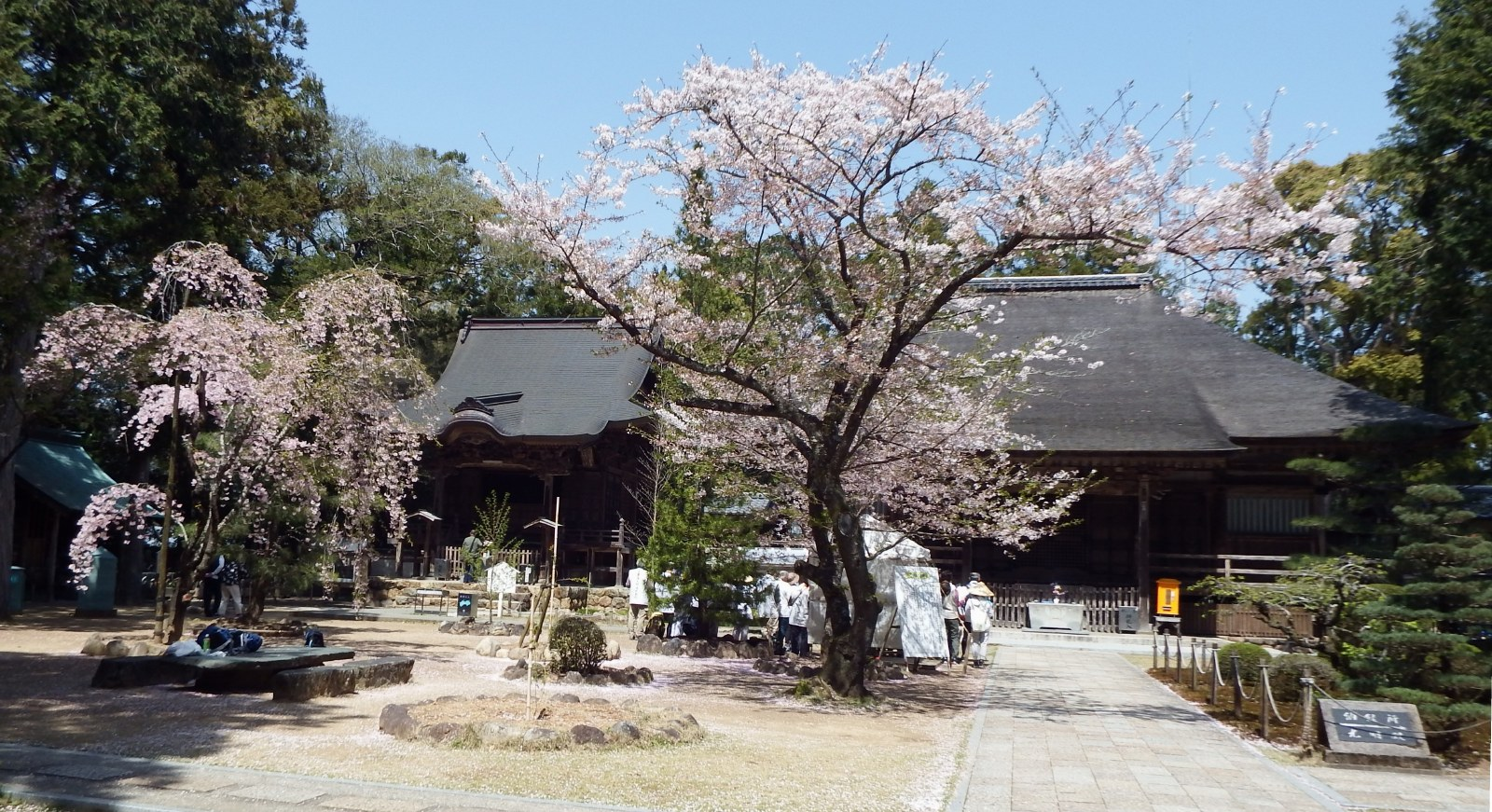
Tosa Kokubunji

Nankoku (南国市, Nankoku-shi) is a city located in Kōchi Prefecture, Japan. As of 31 July 2022, the city had an estimated population of 46‚459 in 22499 households and a population density of 370 persons per km^{2}. The total area of the city is 125.30 square kilometres (48.38 sq mi).

== Geography ==
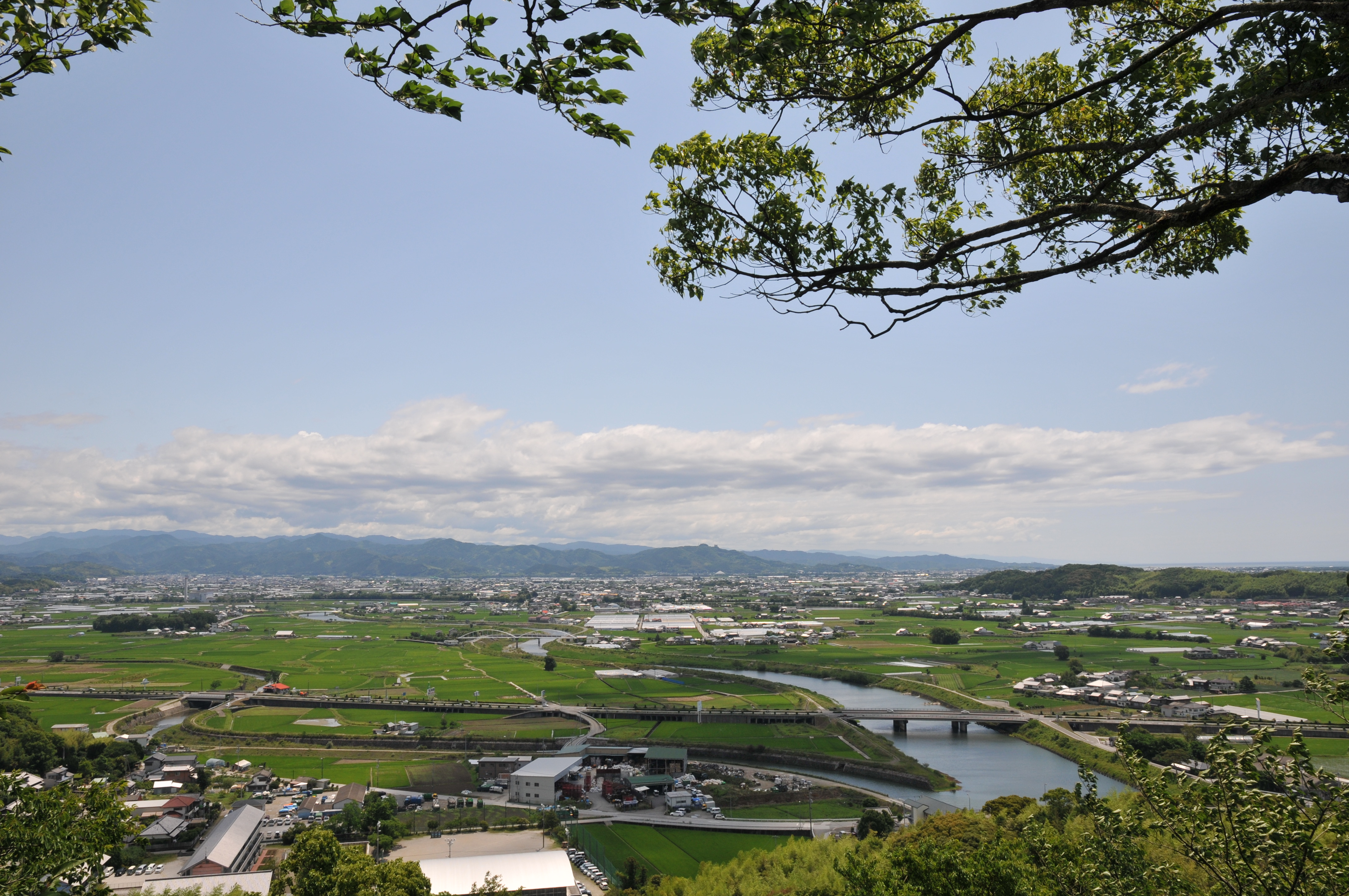
Kachō Plains view from Okō Castle

Nankoku is located in the center of Kochi Prefecture on the island of Shikoku. The northern part of the city is in the southern end of the Shikoku Mountains and the southern part has an eight kilometer long coastline on the Pacific Ocean. In between is the Kochi Plain, with the Mononobe River flowing from north to south on the border with Konan. About half of the municipality is forested.

=== Neighbouring municipalities ===
Kōchi Prefecture

- Kami
- Kōchi
- Kōnan
- Motoyama
- Tosa

=== Climate ===
Nankoku has a humid subtropical climate (Köppen climate classification Cfa) with hot, humid summers and cool winters. There is significant precipitation throughout the year, especially during June and July. The average annual temperature in Nankoku is 16.6 °C (61.9 °F). The average annual rainfall is 2,359.1 mm (92.88 in) with September as the wettest month. The temperatures are highest on average in August, at around 27.2 °C (81.0 °F), and lowest in January, at around 6.0 °C (42.8 °F). The highest temperature ever recorded in Nankoku was 36.9 °C (98.4 °F) on 30 July 2004; the coldest temperature ever recorded was −7.9 °C (17.8 °F) on 8 February 1984.

Climate data for Gomen, Nankoku (1991−2020 normals, extremes 1978−present)
Month	Jan	Feb	Mar	Apr	May	Jun	Jul	Aug	Sep	Oct	Nov	Dec	Year
Record high °C (°F)	21.9 (71.4)	23.0 (73.4)	24.7 (76.5)	28.4 (83.1)	30.1 (86.2)	32.9 (91.2)	35.9 (96.6)	36.9 (98.4)	36.3 (97.3)	31.6 (88.9)	26.2 (79.2)	22.8 (73.0)	36.9 (98.4)
Mean daily maximum °C (°F)	11.5 (52.7)	12.5 (54.5)	15.5 (59.9)	20.0 (68.0)	23.9 (75.0)	26.2 (79.2)	29.9 (85.8)	31.5 (88.7)	28.9 (84.0)	24.4 (75.9)	19.0 (66.2)	13.8 (56.8)	21.4 (70.6)
Daily mean °C (°F)	6.0 (42.8)	7.1 (44.8)	10.5 (50.9)	15.2 (59.4)	19.4 (66.9)	22.5 (72.5)	26.2 (79.2)	27.2 (81.0)	24.4 (75.9)	19.3 (66.7)	13.5 (56.3)	8.1 (46.6)	16.6 (61.9)
Mean daily minimum °C (°F)	0.8 (33.4)	2.0 (35.6)	5.4 (41.7)	10.3 (50.5)	14.8 (58.6)	19.0 (66.2)	23.0 (73.4)	23.6 (74.5)	20.6 (69.1)	14.6 (58.3)	8.5 (47.3)	2.9 (37.2)	12.1 (53.8)
Record low °C (°F)	−7.1 (19.2)	−7.9 (17.8)	−4.6 (23.7)	0.1 (32.2)	5.9 (42.6)	10.6 (51.1)	14.4 (57.9)	16.6 (61.9)	9.2 (48.6)	2.9 (37.2)	−1.4 (29.5)	−5.7 (21.7)	−7.9 (17.8)
Average precipitation mm (inches)	51.7 (2.04)	95.1 (3.74)	153.5 (6.04)	195.6 (7.70)	239.3 (9.42)	316.1 (12.44)	319.2 (12.57)	277.8 (10.94)	335.9 (13.22)	180.4 (7.10)	117.2 (4.61)	77.3 (3.04)	2,359.1 (92.88)
Average precipitation days (≥ 1.0 mm)	5.5	7.0	9.7	9.8	10.1	14.1	12.5	11.5	12.2	8.7	6.8	5.8	113.7
Mean monthly sunshine hours	183.2	171.4	191.9	201.0	201.8	137.0	176.6	208.4	166.4	180.8	165.7	178.0	2,167.8
Source: Japan Meteorological Agency

Climate data for Kōchi Airport, Nankoku (2003−2020 normals, extremes 2003−present)
Month	Jan	Feb	Mar	Apr	May	Jun	Jul	Aug	Sep	Oct	Nov	Dec	Year
Record high °C (°F)	18.9 (66.0)	24.7 (76.5)	24.2 (75.6)	27.4 (81.3)	31.2 (88.2)	31.8 (89.2)	38.3 (100.9)	36.6 (97.9)	36.0 (96.8)	31.6 (88.9)	26.4 (79.5)	22.9 (73.2)	38.3 (100.9)
Mean daily maximum °C (°F)	11.9 (53.4)	13.0 (55.4)	15.7 (60.3)	19.9 (67.8)	23.6 (74.5)	25.9 (78.6)	29.3 (84.7)	31.0 (87.8)	28.7 (83.7)	24.6 (76.3)	19.4 (66.9)	14.0 (57.2)	21.4 (70.6)
Daily mean °C (°F)	6.4 (43.5)	7.9 (46.2)	10.8 (51.4)	15.4 (59.7)	19.5 (67.1)	22.6 (72.7)	26.1 (79.0)	27.3 (81.1)	24.7 (76.5)	19.8 (67.6)	14.3 (57.7)	8.5 (47.3)	16.9 (62.5)
Mean daily minimum °C (°F)	1.0 (33.8)	2.9 (37.2)	5.8 (42.4)	10.6 (51.1)	15.2 (59.4)	19.4 (66.9)	23.4 (74.1)	24.1 (75.4)	21.3 (70.3)	15.6 (60.1)	9.6 (49.3)	3.2 (37.8)	12.7 (54.8)
Record low °C (°F)	−7.9 (17.8)	−7.1 (19.2)	−3.8 (25.2)	1.1 (34.0)	7.3 (45.1)	12.5 (54.5)	17.9 (64.2)	17.5 (63.5)	13.1 (55.6)	7.1 (44.8)	−1.3 (29.7)	−5.8 (21.6)	−7.9 (17.8)
Average precipitation mm (inches)	50.4 (1.98)	106.2 (4.18)	138.1 (5.44)	184.4 (7.26)	199.9 (7.87)	288.6 (11.36)	299.9 (11.81)	255.3 (10.05)	314.9 (12.40)	201.6 (7.94)	111.1 (4.37)	88.0 (3.46)	2,238.3 (88.12)
Average precipitation days (≥ 1.0 mm)	5.3	7.7	9.6	9.1	8.9	12.8	11.8	10.4	11.3	8.8	7.0	5.3	108
Source: Japan Meteorological Agency

== Demographics ==
Per Japanese census data, the population of Nankoku in 2020 is 46,664 people. Nankoku has been conducting censuses since 1960.

Historical population
Year	Pop.	±%
1960	41,798	—
1965	41,237	−1.3%
1970	41,096	−0.3%
1975	42,832	+4.2%
1980	44,866	+4.7%
1985	47,554	+6.0%
1990	46,823	−1.5%
1995	48,192	+2.9%
2000	49,965	+3.7%
2005	50,758	+1.6%
2010	49,472	−2.5%
2015	47,982	−3.0%
2020	46,664	−2.7%
Nankoku population statistics

== History ==
As with all of Kōchi Prefecture, the area of Nankoku was part of ancient Tosa Province. The Tosa Kokubun-ji was built during the Nara period, indicating that it was the center of Tosa Province and in proximity to the provincial capital During the Heian period, the nobleman Ki no Tsurayuki wrote the Tosa Diary while staying in what is now Nankoku. During the Sengoku period, Okō Castle was the stronghold of the Chōsokabe clan, who conquered most of Shikoku. During the Edo period, the area was part of the holdings of Tosa Domain ruled by the Yamauchi clan from their seat at Kōchi Castle. Following the Meiji Restoration, the town of Goman (後免町) was established within Nagaoka District, Kōchi with the creation of the modern municipalities system on April 1, 1889. On September 30, 1956 the town expanded by annexing 5 neighboring villages. On October 1, 1959 Gomen merged with four neighboring villages to form the city of Nankoku.

== Government ==
Nankoku has a mayor-council form of government with a directly elected mayor and a unicameral city council of 21 members. Nankoku contributes two members to the Kōchi Prefectural Assembly. In terms of national politics, the city is part of Kōchi 1st district of the lower house of the Diet of Japan.

== Economy ==
Nankoku has good road, rail and air connections and has an economy based on light manufacturing, food processing, agriculture and distribution. Strong in the fishing industry and the market industry, Nankoku-shi supplies most of Kochi's agricultural needs, because of the amount of fields and plantations.

== Education ==
Kochi Medical School Hospital

Nankoku has 13 public elementary schools and four public middle schools operated by the city government and three public high schools operated by the Kōchi Prefectural Department of Education. There is also one private middle school and one private high school. The prefecture also operates two special education schools for the handicapped. Kochi University's medical school and a branch of the National Institute of Technology and Evaluation are located in Nankoku.

== Transportation ==
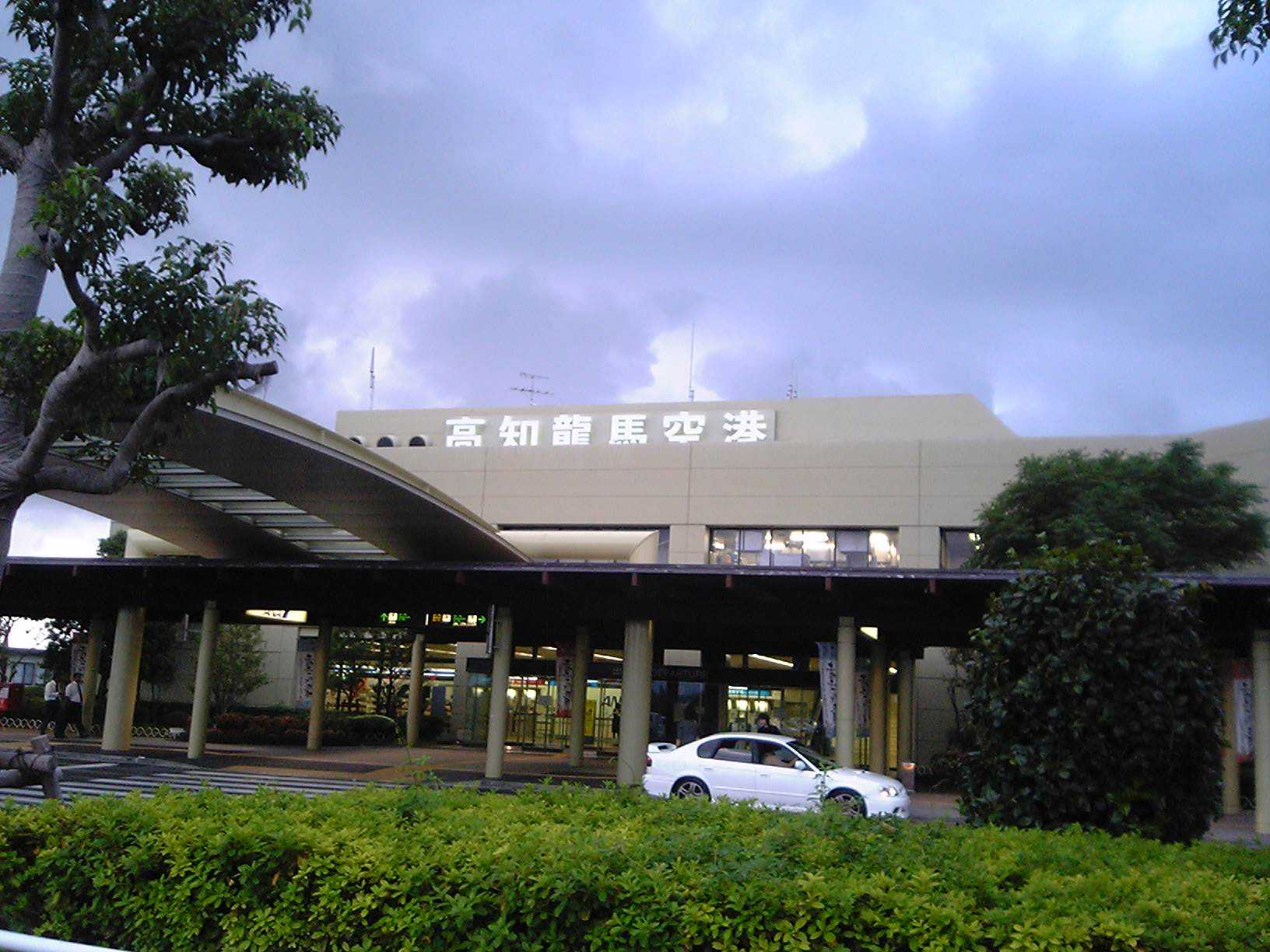
Kōchi Airport

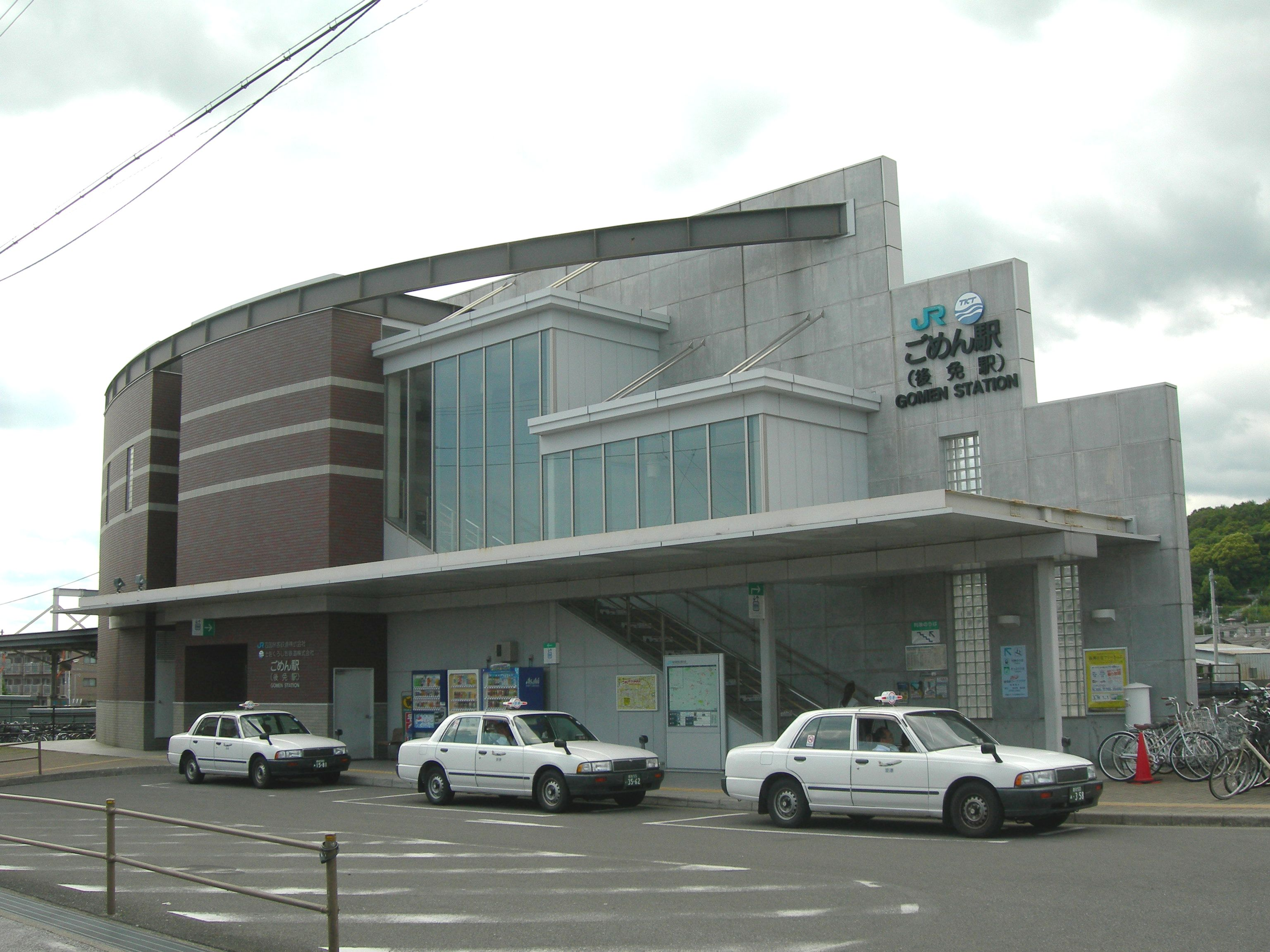
Gomen Station

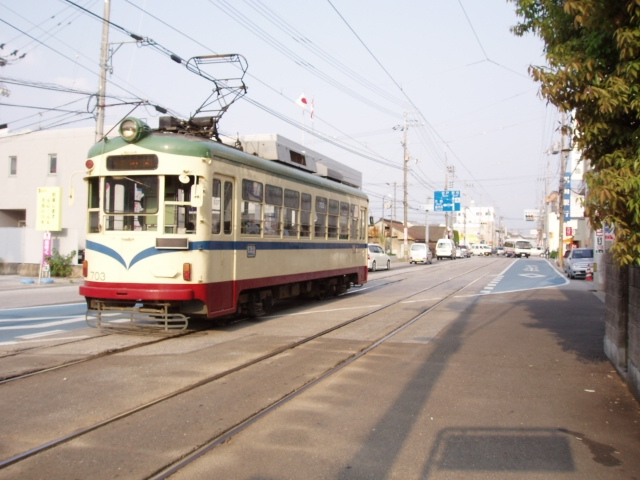
Tram of Tosaden Kōtsū in Nankoku, Kōchi

=== Airport ===
- Kōchi Ryōma Airport

=== Railway ===
Shikoku Railway Company - Dosan Line

- Tosa-Nagaoka - Gomen

Tosa Kuroshio Railway - Asa Line

- Gomen - Gomenmachi - Tateda

Tosaden Kōtsū - Tosaden Kōtsū Gomen Line (tram line)

- Gomenmachi - Gomen-higashimachi - Gomen-nakamachi - Gomen-nishimachi - Higashi-Kōgyōmae - Sumiyoshi-dōri - Shinohara - Kogome-dōri

=== Highways ===
- Kōchi-Tōbu Expressway
- National Route 32
- National Route 55
- National Route 195

== Local attractions ==
- Kōchi Prefectural Museum of History
- Okō Castle, National Historic Site
- Tosa Kokubun-ji, 29th temple on the Shikoku Pilgrimage
- Zenjibu-ji, 32nd temple on the Shikoku Pilgrimage

== Notable people from Nankoku ==
- Hiroshi Miyama, enka singer
- Yuji Okabayashi, professional wrestler
