= Gomen-nishimachi Station =

Tram station in Nankoku, Kōchi Prefecture, Japan

Coordinates: 33°34′33″N 133°38′35″E

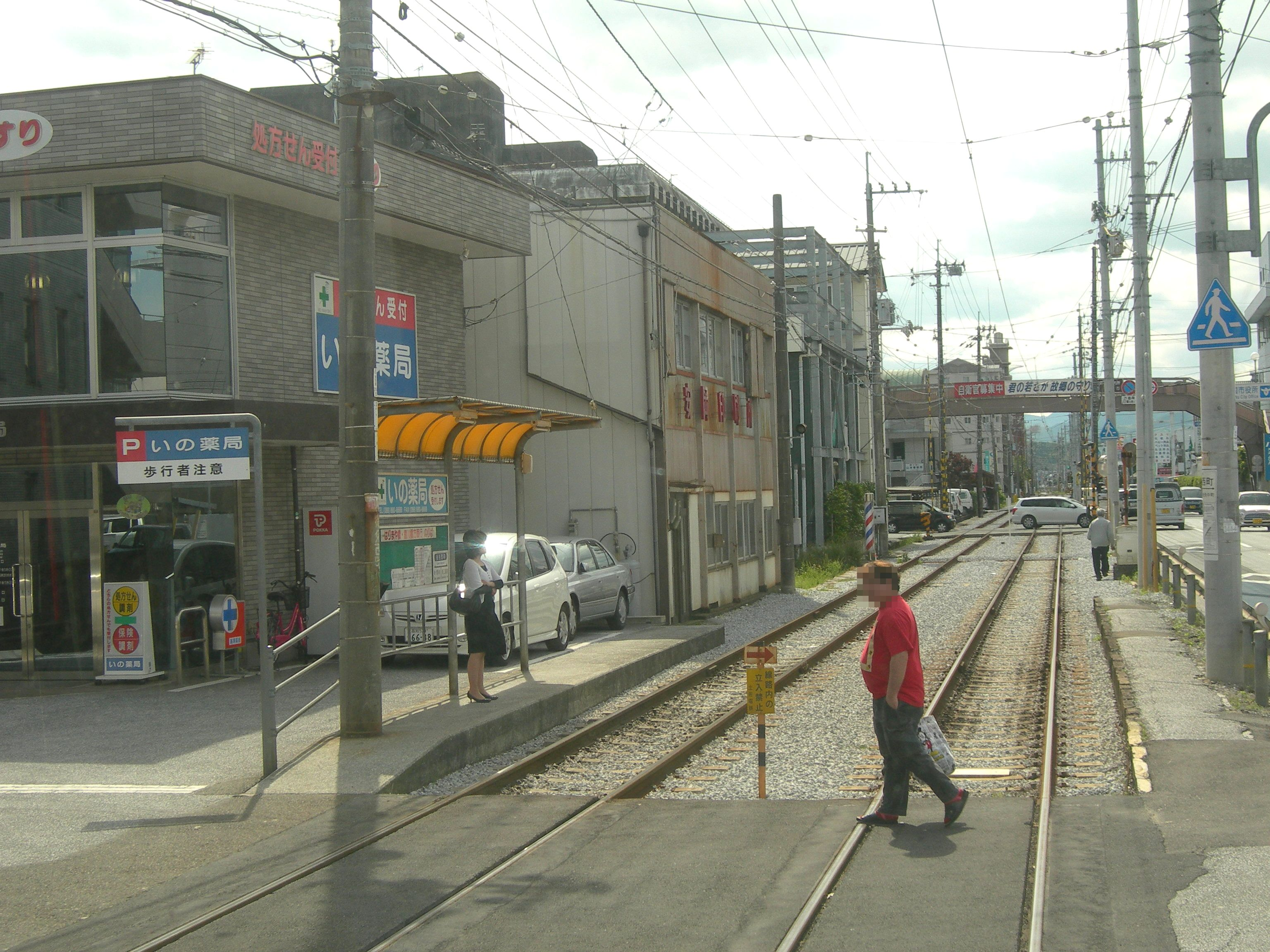
Station

Gomen-nishimachi Station (後免西町駅, Gomen-nishimachi-eki) is a tram station in Nankoku, Japan.

At the time of opening, the station name was Gomen Nishimachi-dori (後免西町通).

It is about 500m away from Gomen Station and it is not a transfer station.

== Lines ==
- Tosa Electric Railway
- Gomen Line

== Adjacent stations ==
«	Service	»
Tosa Electric Railway
Gomen Line
Gomen-nakamachi	-	Higashi-Kōgyōmae
