= Chiyorichō-sanchōme Station =

Tram station in Kōchi, Kōchi Prefecture, Japan

Chiyorichō-sanchōme Station 知寄町三丁目駅
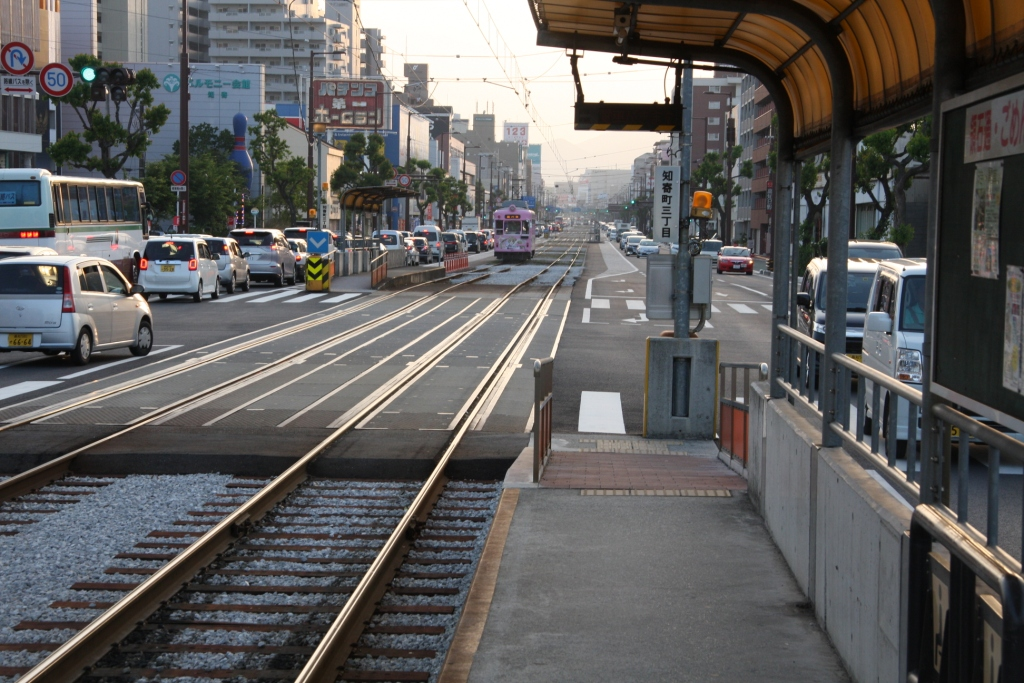
- Chiyorichō-sanchōme Station in 2014

General information
- Location: Kōchi, Kōchi Prefecture; Japan
- Coordinates: 33.557474°N 133.565639°E
- Operated by: Tosa Electric Railway
- Line: Gomen Line
Location

Chiyorichō-sanchōme Station (知寄町三丁目駅, Chiyorichō-sanchōme-eki) is a tram station in Kōchi, Kōchi Prefecture, Japan.

== Lines ==
- Tosa Electric Railway
  - Gomen Line

== Adjacent stations ==
«	Service	»
Tosa Electric Railway
Gomen Line
Kazurashimabashi-higashizume	-	Chiyorichō
