= Kako Station =

Tram station in Kōchi, Kōchi Prefecture, Japan

Coordinates: 33°34′01″N 133°35′50″E

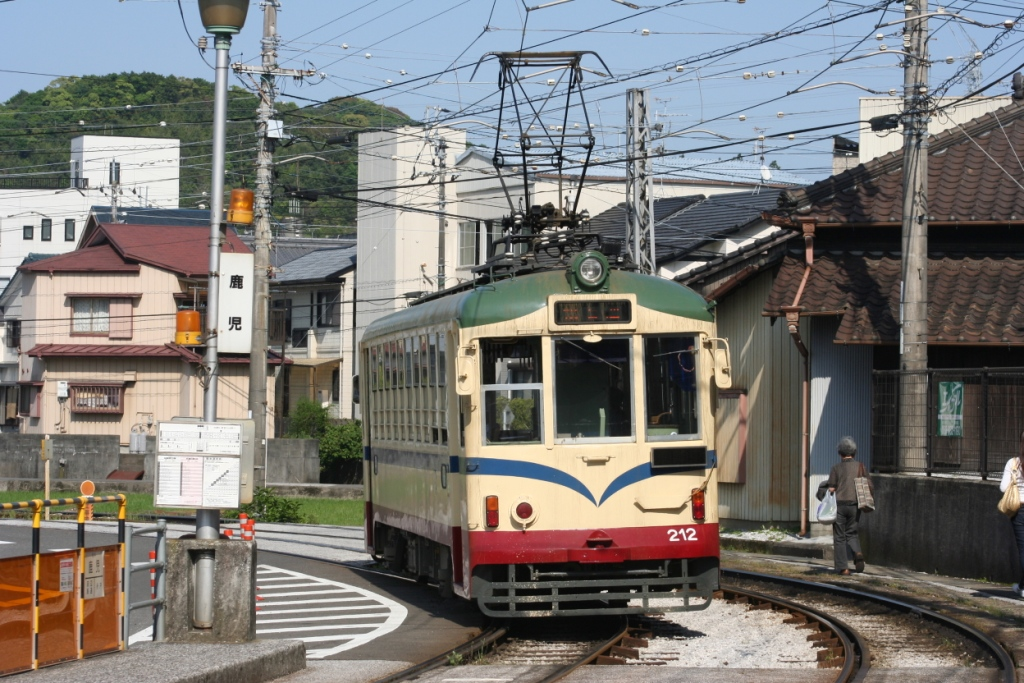
kako railway in 2010

Kako Station (鹿児駅, Kako-eki) is a tram station in Kōchi, Japan.

== Lines ==
- Tosa Electric Railway
  - Gomen Line

== Adjacent stations ==
«	Service	»
Tosa Electric Railway
Gomen Line
Funato	-	Tabeshima-dōri
