= Funato Station (Kōchi) =

Tram station in Kōchi, Kōchi Prefecture, Japan

Coordinates: 33°34′14″N 133°35′58″E

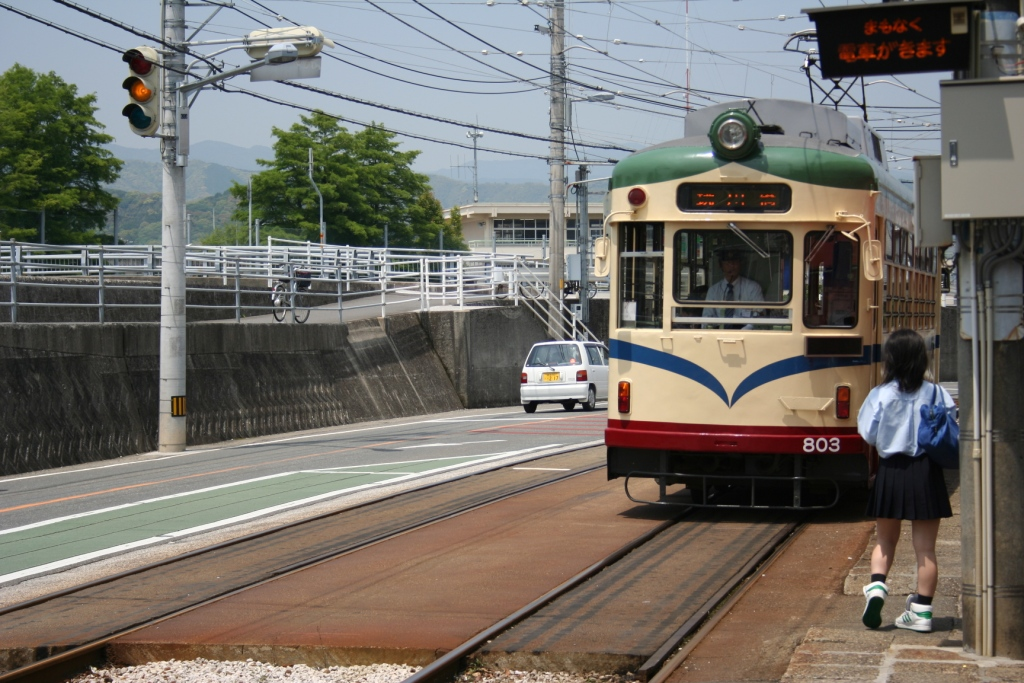
Tosa Electric Railway Funoto Station

Funato Station (舟戸駅, Funato-eki) is a tram station in Kōchi, Japan.

== Lines ==
- Tosa Electric Railway
  - Gomen Line

== Adjacent stations ==
«	Service	»
Tosa Electric Railway
Gomen Line
Kitaura	-	Kako
