= Seiwagakuen-mae Station =

Tram station in Kōchi, Kōchi Prefecture, Japan

Coordinates: 33°34′29″N 133°36′45″E

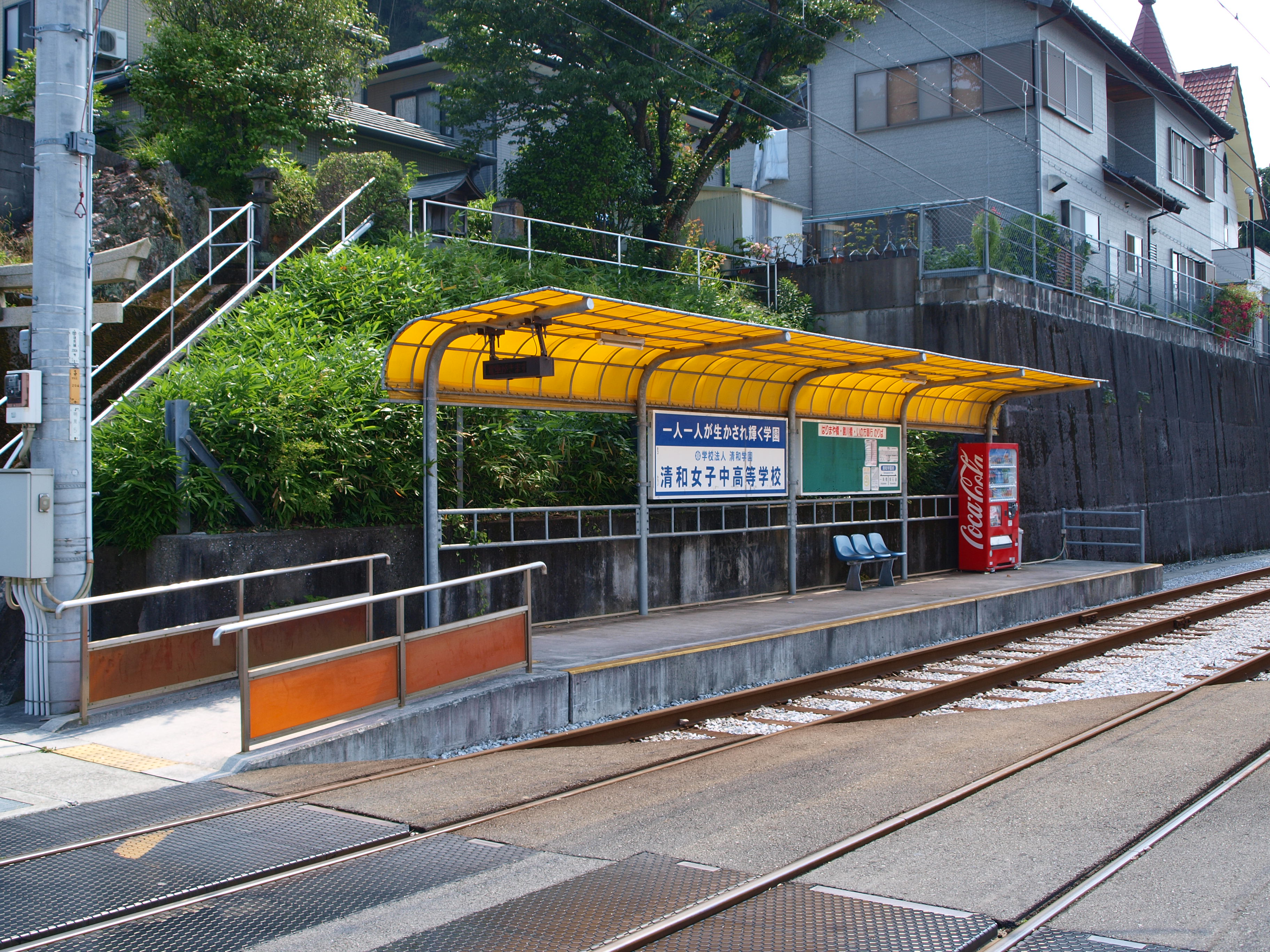
Station

Seiwagakuen-mae Station (清和学園前駅, Seiwagakuen-mae-eki) is a tram station in Kōchi, Japan.

It is only 63 meters from the neighboring Ichijobashi Station, which is the shortest distance between adjacent stations in Japan.

== Lines ==
- Tosa Electric Railway
  - Gomen Line

== Adjacent stations ==
«	Service	»
Tosa Electric Railway
Gomen Line
Ichijōbashi	-	Ryōseki-dōri
