= Hōeichō Station =

Tram station in Kōchi, Kōchi Prefecture, Japan

Coordinates: 33°33′31″N 133°33′13″E

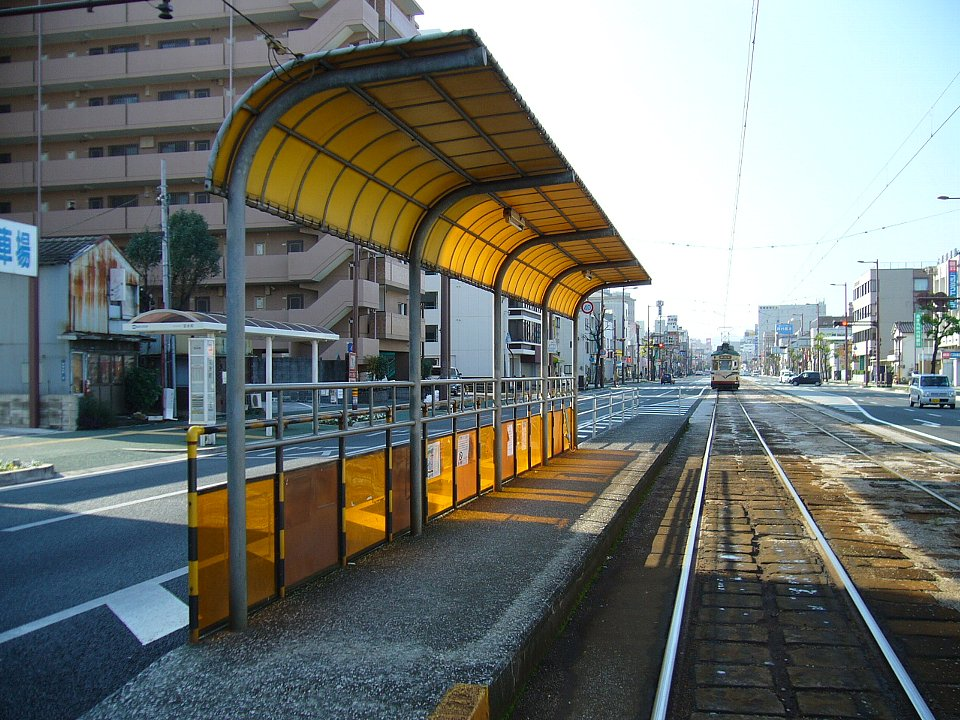

Hōeichō Station (宝永町駅, Hōeichō-eki) is a tram station in Kōchi, Kōchi Prefecture, Japan.

== Lines ==
- Tosa Electric Railway
  - Gomen Line

== Adjacent stations ==
«	Service	»
Tosa Electric Railway
Gomen Line
Chiyorichō-itchōme	-	Saenbachō
