= Chiyorichō-nichōme Station =

Tram station in Kōchi, Kōchi Prefecture, Japan

Coordinates: 33°33′29″N 133°33′36″E

Chiyorichō-nichōme Station 知寄町二丁目駅
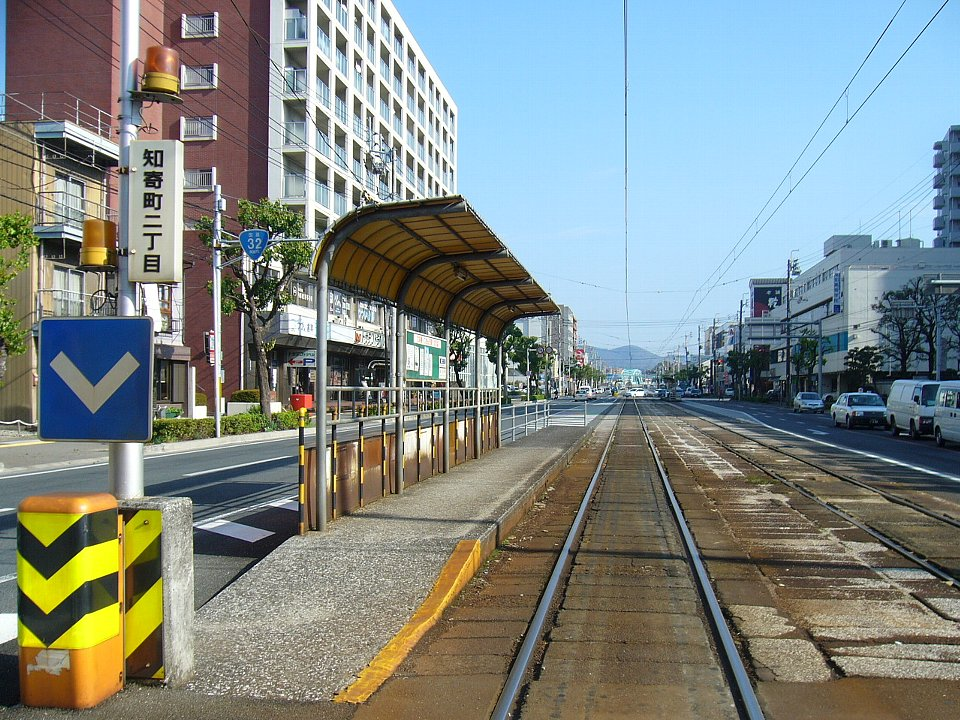

General information
- Location: Kōchi, Kōchi; Japan
- Operator: Tosa
- Line: Gomen

History
- Opened: 1909
Location

Chiyorichō-nichōme Station (知寄町二丁目駅, Chiyorichō-nichōme-eki) is a tram stop in Kōchi, Kōchi Prefecture, Japan.

== Lines ==
- Tosa Electric Railway
  - Gomen Line

== Adjacent stations ==
«	Service	»
Tosa Electric Railway
Gomen Line
Chiyorichō	-	Chiyorichō-itchōme
