= Gomen-nakamachi Station =

Tram station in Nankoku, Kōchi Prefecture, Japan

Coordinates: 33°34′32″N 133°38′46″E

Gomen-nakamachi Station 後免中町駅
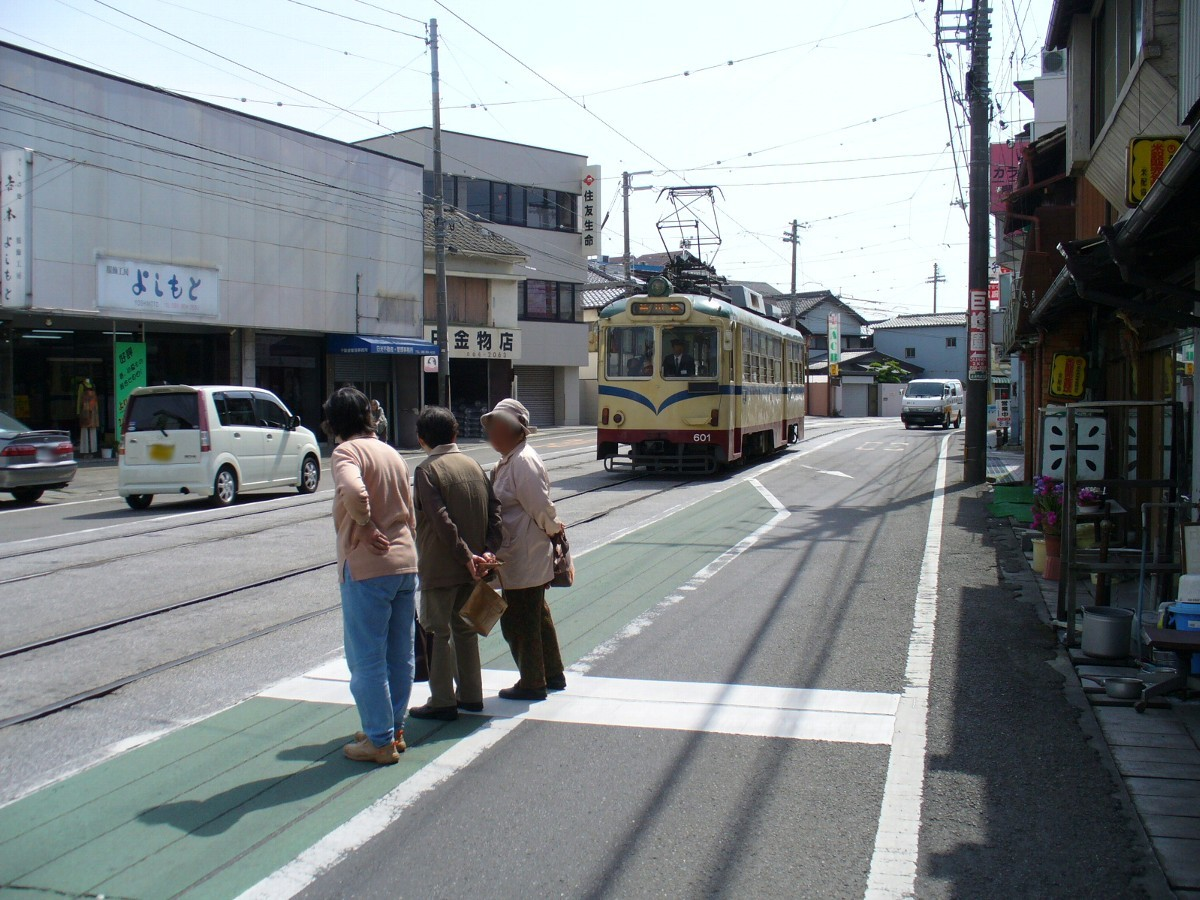

General information
- Location: Nankoku, Japan
- Line: Gomen Line
Location

Gomen-nakamachi Station (後免中町駅, Gomen-nakamachi-eki) is a tram station in Nankoku, Japan.

== Lines ==
- Tosa Electric Railway
  - Gomen Line

== Adjacent stations ==
«	Service	»
Tosa Electric Railway
Gomen Line
Gomen-higashimachi	-	Gomen-nishimachi
