= Ichijōbashi Station =

Tram station in Kōchi, Kōchi Prefecture, Japan

Coordinates: 33°34′29″N 133°36′51″E

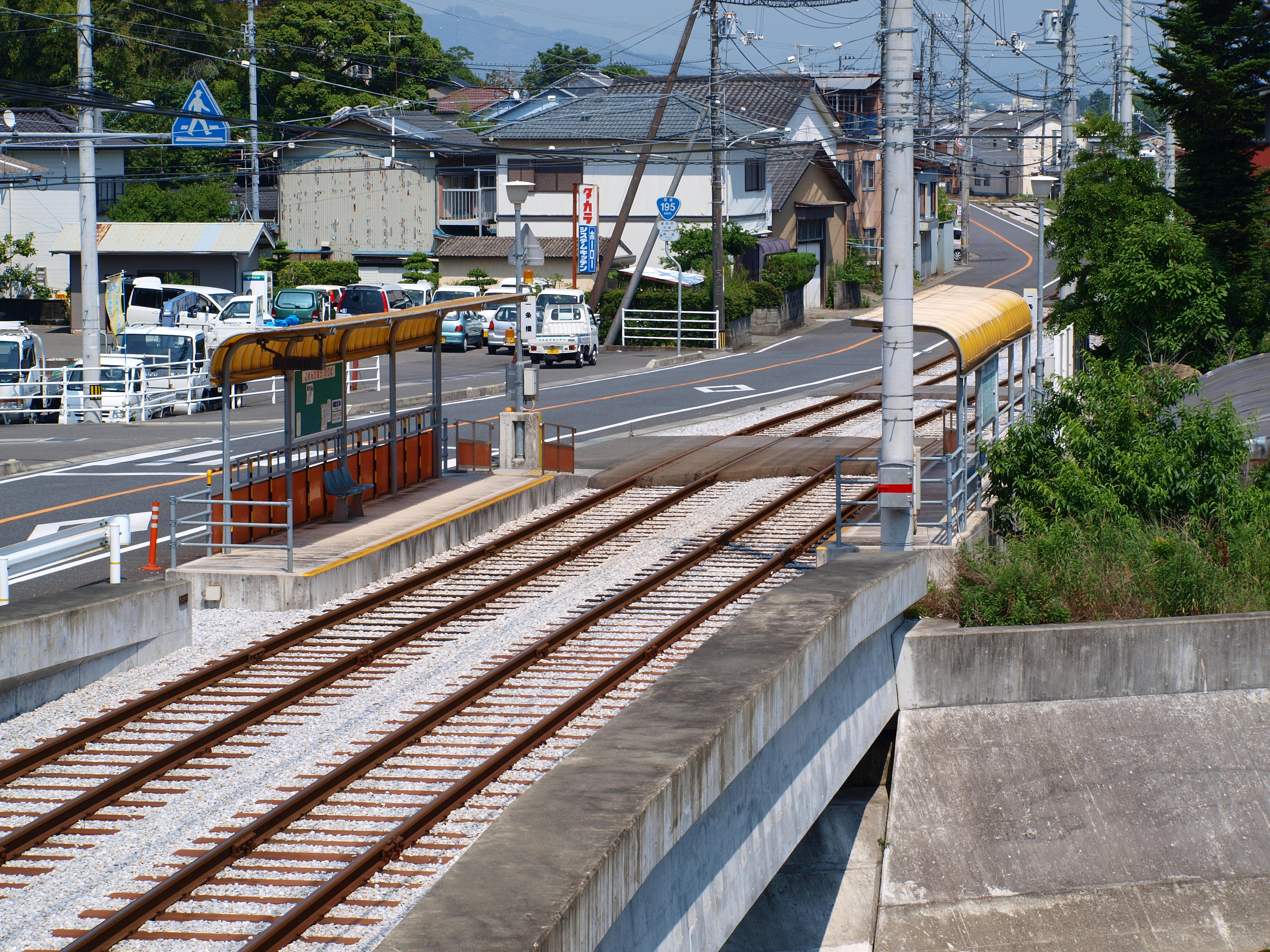
Station

Ichijōbashi Station (一条橋駅, Ichijōbashi-eki) is a tram station in Kōchi, Japan.

It is only 63 meters from the neighboring Seiwagakuen-mae Station, which is the shortest distance between adjacent stations in Japan.

== Lines ==
- Tosa Electric Railway
  - Gomen Line

== Adjacent stations ==
«	Service	»
Tosa Electric Railway
Gomen Line
Myōkenbashi	-	Seiwagakuen-mae
