= Shinohara Station (Kōchi) =

Tram station in Nankoku, Kōchi Prefecture, Japan

Coordinates: 33°34′37″N 133°37′54″E

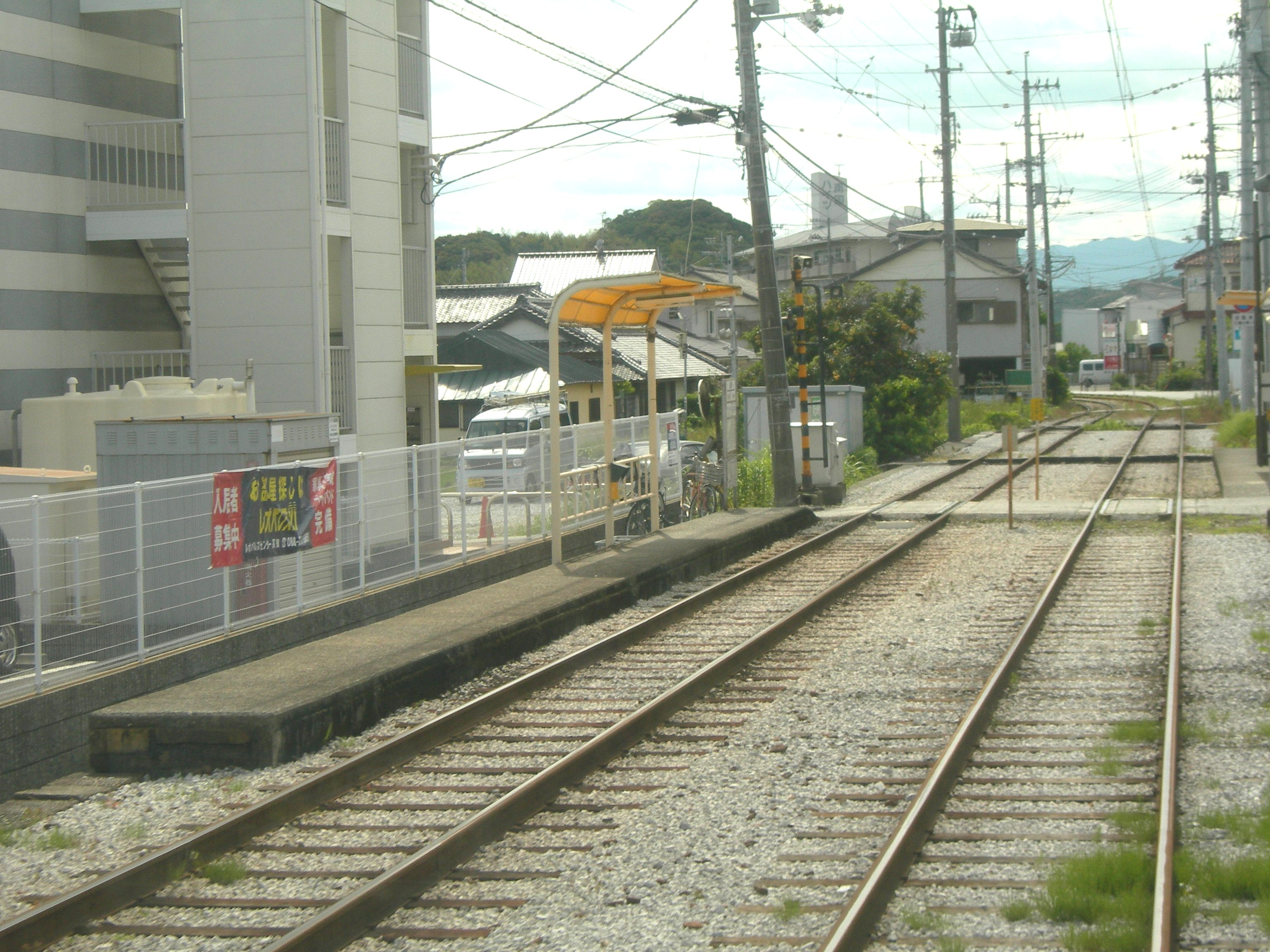
Station

Shinohara Station (篠原停留場, Shinohara-teiryujo) is a tram station in Nankoku, Japan.

== Lines ==
- Tosa Electric Railway
  - Gomen Line

== Adjacent stations ==
«	Service	»
Tosa Electric Railway
Gomen Line
Sumiyoshi-dōri	-	Kogome-dōri
