= Katsunori Wakabayashi =

Japanese physicist

- Born: Nara Prefecture
- Known for: graphene nanoribbon theory
- Awards: Best Paper Award 2003, Physical Society of Japan
- Scientific career
- Fields: Nanotechnology

Katsunori Wakabayashi (若林 克法, Wakabayashi Katsunori) is a physicist at the International Center for Materials Nanoarchitectonics (MANA), National Institute for Materials Science (NIMS), Japan. He is an authority and leading researcher in nanotechnology in the area of energy states of single wall carbon nanotubes (SWCN). His research is notable for the edge effects of the nanographene materials, which is a part of the single layer graphene. He obtained his Ph.D. in 2000 from University of Tsukuba in Japan. From 2000 to 2009 he was an assistant professor at Department of Quantum Matter in Hiroshima University, Japan. From 2009, he is an Independent Scientist at International Center for Materials Nanoarchitectonics (WPI-MANA), National Institute for Materials Science (NIMS) in Tsukuba, Japan. Beside the above primary research position, he was a visiting scholar at ETH-Zurich, Switzerland from 2003 to 2005, also had a concurrent position as PRESTO researcher in Japan Science and Technology Agency (JST).

== Representative publications ==
- Fujita, M.; Wakabayashi, K.; Nakada, K.; Kusakabe, K. (1996). "Peculiar Localized State at Zigzag Graphite Edge". J. Phys. Soc. Jpn. 65 (7): 1920–1923. Bibcode:1996JPSJ...65.1920F. doi:10.1143/JPSJ.65.1920.
- Wakabayashi, K.; Sigrist, M.; Fujita, M. (1998). "Spin Wave Mode of Edge-Localized Magnetic States in Nanographite Zigzag Ribbons". J. Phys. Soc. Jpn. 67 (6): 2089–2093. Bibcode:1998JPSJ...67.2089W. doi:10.1143/JPSJ.67.2089.
- Wakabayashi, K.; Fujita, M.; Ajiki, H.; Sigrist, M. (1999). "Electronic and magnetic properties of nanographite ribbons". Phys. Rev. B. 59 (12): 8271–8282. arXiv:cond-mat/9809260. Bibcode:1999PhRvB..59.8271W. doi:10.1103/PhysRevB.59.8271. S2CID 119523846.
- Wakabayashi, K. (2001). "Electronic transport properties of nanographite ribbon junctions". Phys. Rev. B. 64 (12) 125428. Bibcode:2001PhRvB..64l5428W. doi:10.1103/PhysRevB.64.125428.
- Wakabayashi, K.; Sigrist, M. (2000). "Zero-Conductance Resonances due to Flux States in Nanographite Ribbon Junctions". Phys. Rev. Lett. 84 (15): 3390–3393. arXiv:cond-mat/9907212. Bibcode:2000PhRvL..84.3390W. doi:10.1103/PhysRevLett.84.3390. PMID 11019097. S2CID 33507447.
- Wakabayashi, K.; Takane, Y.; Sigrist, M. (2007). "Perfectly Conducting Channel and Universality Crossover in Disordered Graphene Nanoribbons". Phys. Rev. Lett. 99 (3) 036601. arXiv:cond-mat/0702230. Bibcode:2007PhRvL..99c6601W. doi:10.1103/PhysRevLett.99.036601. PMID 17678303. S2CID 29023466.
- Katsunori Wakabayashi, "Low-Energy Physical Properties of Edge States in Nano-Carbon Systems", in Springer Series in Solid State Physics, vol. 156, S.N. Kamakar et al. eds., ISBN 978-3-540-72631-9
- Katsunori Wakabayashi, Electronic and Magnetic Properties of Nanographite, p. 279–304, Carbon-based Magnetism – An overview of the magnetism of metal free carbon-based compounds and materials edited by T. Makarova, F. Palacio, (Elsevier, 2006). ISBN 0-444-51947-5.

== Award ==
The original paper of graphene edge state and graphene nanoribbons was awarded the JPS Best Paper Award in March 2003 from the Physical Society of Japan. He has been awarded the commendation of ministry of education, culture, sports, science and technology (MEXT), Japan in 2010 for the contribution of pioneering works on theoretical research of nanoscale effect on electronic properties of graphene. In 2017, he has been awarded the JSPS Prize from Japan Society for the Promotion of Science (JSPS).

== See also ==
- Graphene oxide paper
- Carbon nanotubes
- Mitsutaka Fujita
