= Anirban Bandyopadhyay =

Indian physicist and nanoscientist

Anirban Bandyopadhyay is an Indian physicist and nanoscientist known for his research in molecular electronics, unconventional computing, and biophysics of consciousness. He is currently a Principal Research Scientist at the International Center for Materials Nanoarchitectonics (MANA), of the National Institute for Materials Science (NIMS) in Tsukuba, Japan. He is also an adjunct professor at the Center for Quantum Science and Technologies at IIT Mandi^{[2]}, where there is a controversy regarding him being involved in a funding scam^{[3]}.

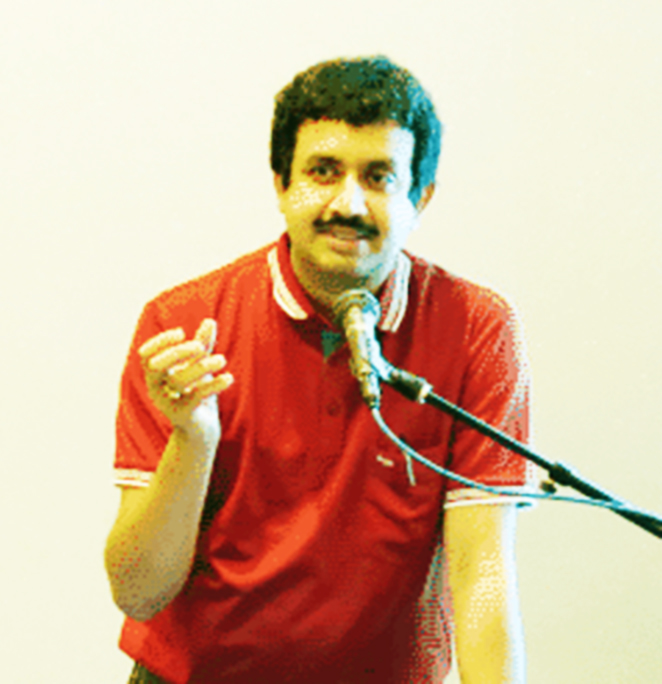
Anirban 2017 TSC conference

Bandyopadhyay completed his Ph.D. in physics at the Indian Association for the Cultivation of Science (IACS), Kolkata. During his doctoral studies, he was a visiting research fellow at Sheffield Hallam University in the United Kingdom (2003–2004).

Bandyopadhyay joined NIMS in 2005 as an ICYS Research Fellow under Japan's MEXT program. He later held positions as a scientist in the Advanced Scanning Probe Microscopy group from 2008 to 2010 and senior scientist in the Surface Characterization group from 2011 to 2020. In 2021, he became a principal research scientist in the Functional Chromophore group at NIMS' International Center for Materials Nanoarchitectonics (MANA).

He was a visiting scientist at the Massachusetts Institute of Technology (MIT) in 2013–2014. Bandyopadhyay has served in editorial roles for journals including Frontiers in Neuroscience, Information (MDPI), and the International Journal of Unconventional Computing.

== Research ==
Bandyopadhyay's research spans nanotechnology, molecular electronics, biophysics, and cognitive science. He has been developing reconfigurable circuits for brain inspired molecular computer. A Adamatzky wrote about his Quantum Cellular automaton work in Nature Physics "Most computer processors work in series, performing one instruction at a time. This limits the speed with which they can carry out certain types of task. A parallel computational approach based on arrays of simultaneously interacting molecular switches could provide a more efficient solution.".

He is known for developing the concept of a "nano brain," a wheel-like architecture for molecular-scale information processing inspired by biological systems. The work led to invention of self-operating nanomachines that has 32 molecular motors, sensors, molecular switches in a single dendritic molecule, exhibiting potentials for cancer drug.

His work has also focused on the role of rhythmic oscillations in proteins and their implications for cognition, memory, and consciousness. He studied individual microtubule using scanning tunneling microscope and estimated information processing ability of microtubular network.

Steve Volk wrote in Discover Magazine "this bundle of nanowire (microtubule in a neuron) resonates like a guitar string, firing thousands of times faster than normal activity in a neuron. The neuron, he thought, contrary to all current scientific understanding, wasn't the essential, or first cause of the human thought process."

== Publications ==
Bandyopadhyay is currently editing a book series entitled "Studies in Rhythm Engineering", by Springer Nature(https://link.springer.com/series/16136) along with Kanad Ray and Chi-Sang Poon.

Bandyopadhyay has authored or co-authored several books and numerous journal articles. Notable publications include:

=== Monographs ===
- Bandyopadhyay, Anirban (2020). Nanobrain. doi:10.1201/9780429107771. ISBN 978-0-429-10777-1.
- Biological Antenna to the Humanoid Bot. Studies in Rhythm Engineering. 2022. doi:10.1007/978-981-16-9677-0. ISBN 978-981-16-9676-3.
- Emotion, Cognition and Silent Communication: Unsolved Mysteries. Studies in Rhythm Engineering. 2024. doi:10.1007/978-981-99-9334-5. ISBN 978-981-99-9333-8.

=== Edited volumes ===
- Rhythmic Oscillations in Proteins to Human Cognition. Studies in Rhythm Engineering. 2021. doi:10.1007/978-981-15-7253-1. ISBN 978-981-15-7252-4.
- Rhythmic Advantages in Big Data and Machine Learning. Studies in Rhythm Engineering. 2022. doi:10.1007/978-981-16-5723-8. ISBN 978-981-16-5722-1.
- Brain-like Super Intelligence from Bio-electromagnetism. Studies in Rhythm Engineering. 2024. doi:10.1007/978-981-97-0232-9. ISBN 978-981-97-0231-2.

== Recognition ==
- President's Medal, NIMS (2009, 2021)
- Hitachi Science and Technology Foundation Award (2010)
- Kurata Memorial Award (2010)
- Inamori Foundation Fellowship (2011–2012)
- Gold Medal from Systems Society of India (2017)
- Finalist for the Palo Alto Longevity Prize (2015–2019)
- Prada Foundation selected him among "thirty-six neuroscientists, psychologists, neurolinguists, and philosophers from five continents", for Human Brains project.

== Selected publications ==
- Bandyopadhyay, A.; Pal, A.J. (17 November 2003). "Tuning of Organic Reversible Switching via Self-Assembled Supramolecular Structures". Advanced Materials. 15 (22): 1949–1952. Bibcode:2003AdM....15.1949B. doi:10.1002/adma.200305309.
- Pati, Ranjit; McClain, Mike; Bandyopadhyay, Anirban (16 June 2008). "Origin of Negative Differential Resistance in a Strongly Coupled Single Molecule-Metal Junction Device". Physical Review Letters. 100 (24) 246801. arXiv:0803.3342. Bibcode:2008PhRvL.100x6801P. doi:10.1103/PhysRevLett.100.246801. PMID 18643607.
- Sahu, Satyajit; Ghosh, Subrata; Ghosh, Batu; Aswani, Krishna; Hirata, Kazuto; Fujita, Daisuke; Bandyopadhyay, Anirban (September 2013). "Atomic water channel controlling remarkable properties of a single brain microtubule: Correlating single protein to its supramolecular assembly". Biosensors and Bioelectronics. 47: 141–148. doi:10.1016/j.bios.2013.02.050. PMID 23567633.
- Singh, Pushpendra; Saxena, Komal; Sahoo, Pathik; Ghosh, Subrata; Bandyopadhyay, Anirban (June 2021). "Electrophysiology using coaxial atom probe array: live imaging reveals hidden circuits of a hippocampal neural network". Journal of Neurophysiology. 125 (6): 2107–2116. doi:10.1152/jn.00478.2020. PMID 33881910.
- Bandyopadhyay, Anirban; Acharya, Somobrata (11 March 2008). "A 16-bit parallel processing in a molecular assembly". Proceedings of the National Academy of Sciences. 105 (10): 3668–3672. Bibcode:2008PNAS..105.3668B. doi:10.1073/pnas.0703105105. PMC 2268776. PMID 18332437.
- Bandyopadhyay, Anirban; Pati, Ranjit; Sahu, Satyajit; Peper, Ferdinand; Fujita, Daisuke (May 2010). "Massively parallel computing on an organic molecular layer". Nature Physics. 6 (5): 369–375. arXiv:1110.5844. Bibcode:2010NatPh...6..369B. doi:10.1038/nphys1636.
- Ghosh, Subrata; Dutta, Mrinal; Sahu, Satyajit; Fujita, Daisuke; Bandyopadhyay, Anirban (March 2014). "Nano Molecular-Platform: A Protocol to Write Energy Transmission Program Inside a Molecule for Bio-Inspired Supramolecular Engineering". Advanced Functional Materials. 24 (10): 1364–1371. doi:10.1002/adfm.201302111.
- Singhania, Anup; Ghosh, Indrani; Sahoo, Pathik; Fujita, Daisuke; Ghosh, Subrata; Bandyopadhyay, Anirban (9 September 2020). "Radio Waveguide–Double Ratchet Rotors Work in Unison on a Surface to Convert Heat into Power". Nano Letters. 20 (9): 6891–6898. Bibcode:2020NanoL..20.6891S. doi:10.1021/acs.nanolett.0c02898. PMID 32787137.
- Ghosh, Subrata; Roy, Anirban; Singhania, Anup; Chatterjee, Somnath; Swarnakar, Snehasikta; Fujita, Daisuke; Bandyopadhyay, Anirban (2018). "In-vivo & in-vitro toxicity test of molecularly engineered PCMS: A potential drug for wireless remote controlled treatment". Toxicology Reports. 5: 1044–1052. Bibcode:2018ToxR....5.1044G. doi:10.1016/j.toxrep.2018.10.011. PMC 6214879. PMID 30406021.
- Sahoo, Pathik; Singh, Pushpendra; Saxena, Komal; Ghosh, Subrata; Singh, R P; Benosman, Ryad; Hill, Jonathan P; Nakayama, Tomonobu; Bandyopadhyay, Anirban (December 2023). "A general-purpose organic gel computer that learns by itself". Neuromorphic Computing and Engineering. 3 (4): 044007. doi:10.1088/2634-4386/ad0fec.
