= Mitsutaka =

- Gender: Male

Origin
- Origin: Japanese
- Meaning: Different meanings depending on the kanji used

Mitsutaka (written: 光隆, 光高 or 光孝) is a masculine Japanese given name. Notable people with the name include:

- Mitsutaka Fujita (藤田 光孝) (1959–1998), Japanese physicist
- Hachisuka Mitsutaka (蜂須賀 光隆) (1630–1666), Japanese daimyō
- Mitsutaka Kusakabe (born 1968), Japanese golfer
- Maeda Mitsutaka (前田 光高) (1616–1645), Japanese daimyō
- Mitsutaka Tachikawa (born 1949), Japanese voice actor
