= Graphene boron nitride nanohybrid materials =

Graphene-Boron Nitride nanohybrid materials are a class of compounds created from graphene and boron nitride nanosheets. Graphene and boron nitride both contain intrinsic thermally conductive and electrically insulative properties. The combination of these two compounds may be useful to advance the development and understanding of electronics.

Several efforts have been made to create hybrid nanomaterials to explore their novel properties compared to their individual constituents. Studies have shown that nanohybrid materials distinctively utilize the best aspects of the individual constituents along with their novel functionalities though structural integrity and interfacial chemical bonding of the constituents.

== Atomic Structure ==
Graphene boron nitride nanohybrid materials are created through synthetic methods such as electron beam welding and chemical vapor deposition. Various different heterostructures of graphene and boron nitride can be assembled. Due to their isostructural, nearly lattice matched and isoelectronic properties, they can form a two-dimensional interface with a line boundary separating the structures. Other unique structures include boron nitride coated carbon nanotubes, and double layers of graphene joined in a pillared fashion by a boron nitride nanotube. The junction created by this stacking arrangement can result in two different junction configurations: one symmetric junction with two heptagonal rings and one asymmetric junction with three octagonal rings. Comparing the two configurations, the octagonal junction seems to be more stable due to higher pi-pi stacking interactions which induces orbital overlap and mixing between the C atoms of the graphene. This introduces a higher band gap, which indicates more effective insulating properties.

Figure 1. Example of the heptagonal junction in pillars of Graphene and Boron-Nitride. This junction geometry induces more strain on the pillar, lowering stability of the structure, and does not significantly raise the band gap to an insulating level.

Figure 2. The octagonal junction when creating Graphene Boron-Nitride hybrids. This configuration is structurally more stable than the heptagonal, and creates orbital overlap in the pillar, spreading out the electron density and increasing the band gap of the material to resemble an electrical insulator.

== Properties ==
The properties of these hybrid materials range between the properties of the constituent atoms and between individual hybrid structures. Graphene is considered a zero band semi-conductor and boron nitride is considered a wide gap semi conductor. Combining the two in various arrangements leads to a variable band gap which can be tuned by structure specifics to have various properties. Multi-walled carbon nanotubes when coated with boron nitride exhibit enhanced thermal activity compared to the substituents, but act as an electrical insulator. Graphene layers combined by boron nitride nanotubes exhibit similar band gap changes, but the strain of the ring position in the junction also induces a pseudomagnetic force on the ring structure due to the electron delocalization.

Figure 3. Example of a single layer of alternating graphene and boron nitride nano ribbons. By controlling the thickness and geometry of each layer, the electronic and thermal properties can be tuned while still maintaining nearly identical mechanical properties as a single sheet of either boron nitride or graphene.

== Applications ==
Graphene boron nitride nanohybrid materials may be useful for further development in nanoelectronics and 3D thermal and mechanical properties. Theoretical and experimental studies have demonstrated straining of graphene can result in high flexibility and can tune the electronic structure of graphene to produce enormous pseudomagnetic fields. This new theory opens up new possibilities in straining graphene boron nitride hybrid to advance new concepts of electronics.

== See also ==
- Boron Nitride
- Graphene Nanoribbons
