= Graphene nanoribbon =

Carbon allotrope

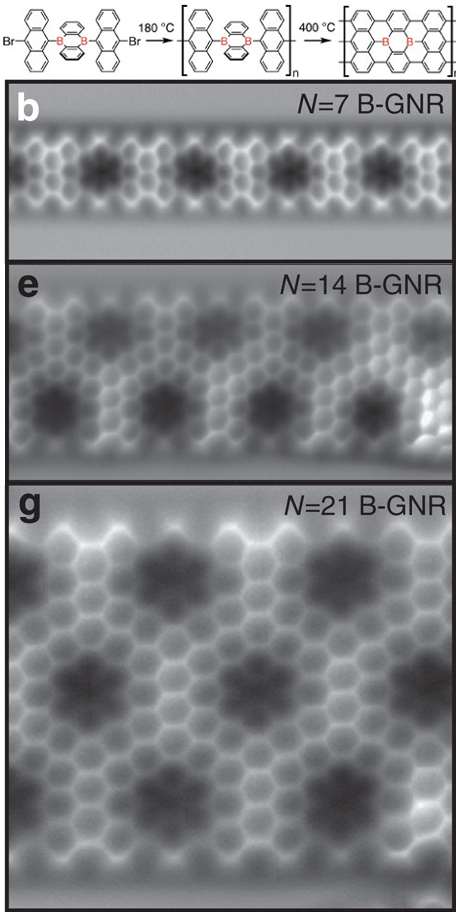
Atomic Force Microscopy (AFM) images of graphene nanoribbons having periodic width and boron doping pattern. The polymerization reaction used for their synthesis is shown on top.

Graphene nanoribbons (GNRs, also called nano-graphene ribbons or nano-graphite ribbons) are strips of graphene with width less than 100 nm. Graphene ribbons were introduced as a theoretical model by Mitsutaka Fujita and coauthors to examine the edge and nanoscale size effect in graphene. Some earlier studies of graphitic ribbons within the area of conductive polymers in the field of synthetic metals include works by Kazuyoshi Tanaka, Tokio Yamabe and co-authors, Steven Kivelson and Douglas J. Klein. While Tanaka, Yamabe and Kivelson studied so-called zigzag and armchair edges of graphite, Klein introduced a different edge geometry that is frequently referred to as a bearded edge.

== Production ==
=== Nanotomy ===
Large quantities of width-controlled GNRs can be produced via graphite nanotomy, where applying a sharp diamond knife on graphite produces graphite nanoblocks, which can then be exfoliated to produce GNRs as shown by Vikas Berry. GNRs can also be produced by "unzipping" or axially cutting nanotubes. In one such method multi-walled carbon nanotubes were unzipped in solution by action of potassium permanganate and sulfuric acid. In another method GNRs were produced by plasma etching of nanotubes partly embedded in a polymer film. More recently, graphene nanoribbons were grown onto silicon carbide (SiC) substrates using ion implantation followed by vacuum or laser annealing. The latter technique allows any pattern to be written on SiC substrates with 5 nm precision.

=== Epitaxy ===
GNRs were grown on the edges of three-dimensional structures etched into silicon carbide wafers. When the wafers are heated to approximately 1,000 °C (1,270 K; 1,830 °F), silicon is preferentially driven off along the edges, forming nanoribbons whose structure is determined by the pattern of the three-dimensional surface. The ribbons had perfectly smooth edges, annealed by the fabrication process. Electron mobility measurements surpassing one million correspond to a sheet resistance of one ohm per square — two orders of magnitude lower than in two-dimensional graphene.

=== Chemical vapor deposition ===
Nanoribbons narrower than 10 nm grown on a germanium wafer act like semiconductors, exhibiting a band gap. Inside a reaction chamber, using chemical vapor deposition, methane is used to deposit hydrocarbons on the wafer surface, where they react with each other to produce long, smooth-edged ribbons. The ribbons were used to create prototype transistors. At a very slow growth rate, the graphene crystals naturally grow into long nanoribbons on a specific germanium crystal facet. By controlling the growth rate and growth time, the researchers achieved control over the nanoribbon width.

Recently, researchers from SIMIT (Shanghai Institute of Microsystem and Information Technology, Chinese Academy of Sciences) reported on a strategy to grow graphene nanoribbons with controlled widths and smooth edges directly onto dielectric hexagonal boron nitride (h-BN) substrates. The team use nickel nanoparticles to etch monolayer-deep, nanometre-wide trenches into h-BN, and subsequently fill them with graphene using chemical vapour deposition. Modifying the etching parameters allows the width of the trench to be tuned to less than 10 nm, and the resulting sub-10-nm ribbons display bandgaps of almost 0.5 eV. Integrating these nanoribbons into field effect transistor devices reveals on–off ratios of greater than 10^{4} at room temperature, as well as high carrier mobilities of ~750 cm^{2} V^{−1} s^{−1}.

=== Multistep nanoribbon synthesis ===
A bottom-up approach was investigated. In 2017 dry contact transfer was used to press a fiberglass applicator coated with a powder of atomically precise graphene nanoribbons on a hydrogen-passivated Si(100) surface under vacuum. 80 of 115 GNRs visibly obscured the substrate lattice with an average apparent height of 0.30 nm. The GNRs do not align to the Si lattice, indicating a weak coupling. The average bandgap over 21 GNRs was 2.85 eV with a standard deviation of 0.13 eV.

The method unintentionally overlapped some nanoribbons, allowing the study of multilayer GNRs. Such overlaps could be formed deliberately by manipulation with a scanning tunneling microscope. Hydrogen depassivation left no band-gap. Covalent bonds between the Si surface and the GNR leads to metallic behavior. The Si surface atoms move outward, and the GNR changes from flat to distorted, with some C atoms moving in toward the Si surface.

== Electronic structure ==
The electronic states of GNRs largely depend on the edge structures (armchair or zigzag). In zigzag edges each successive edge segment is at the opposite angle to the previous. In armchair edges, each pair of segments is a 120/-120 degree rotation of the prior pair. The animation below provides a visualization explanation of both. Zigzag edges provide the edge localized state with non-bonding molecular orbitals near the Fermi energy. They are expected to have large changes in optical and electronic properties from quantization.

Calculations based on tight binding theory predict that zigzag GNRs are always metallic while armchairs can be either metallic or semiconducting, depending on their width. However, density functional theory (DFT) calculations show that armchair nanoribbons are semiconducting with an energy gap scaling with the inverse of the GNR width. Experiments verified that energy gaps increase with decreasing GNR width. Graphene nanoribbons with controlled edge orientation have been fabricated by scanning tunneling microscope (STM) lithography. Energy gaps up to 0.5 eV in a 2.5 nm wide armchair ribbon were reported.

Armchair nanoribbons are metallic or semiconducting and present spin polarized edges. Their gap opens thanks to an unusual antiferromagnetic coupling between the magnetic moments at opposite edge carbon atoms. This gap size is inversely proportional to the ribbon width and its behavior can be traced back to the spatial distribution properties of edge-state wave functions, and the mostly local character of the exchange interaction that originates the spin polarization. Therefore, the quantum confinement, inter-edge superexchange, and intra-edge direct exchange interactions in zigzag GNR are important for its magnetism and band gap. The edge magnetic moment and band gap of zigzag GNR are reversely proportional to the electron/hole concentration and they can be controlled by alkaline adatoms.

Their 2D structure, high electrical and thermal conductivity and low noise also make GNRs a possible alternative to copper for integrated circuit interconnects. Research is exploring the creation of quantum dots by changing the width of GNRs at select points along the ribbon, creating quantum confinement. Heterojunctions inside single graphene nanoribbons have been realized, among which structures that have been shown to function as tunnel barriers.

Graphene nanoribbons possess semiconductive properties and may be a technological alternative to silicon semiconductors capable of sustaining microprocessor clock speeds in the vicinity of 1 THz field-effect transistors less than 10 nm wide have been created with GNR – "GNRFETs" – with an I_{on}/I_{off} ratio >10^{6} at room temperature.

GNR band structure for armchair type. Tight binding calculations show that armchair type can be semiconducting or metallic depending on width (chirality).

GNR band structure for zigzag type. Tight binding calculations predict that zigzag type is always metallic.

=== Electronic structure in external fields ===
The electronic properties in external field such as static electric or magnetic field have been extensively studied. The various levels of the tight-binding model as well as first principles calculations have been employed for such studies.

For zigzag nanoribbons the most interesting effect under an external electric field is inducing of half-metallicity. In a simple tight-binding model the effect of the external in-plane field applied across the ribbon width is the band gap opening between the edge states. However, the first principles spin-polarized calculations demonstrate that the spin up and down species behave differently. One spin projection closes the band gap whereas another increases. As a result, at some critical value of field, the ribbon turns into a metallic for one spin projection (up or down) and an insulating for another spin (down or up). In this way, half-metallicity that may be useful for spintronics applications is induced.

Armchair ribbons behave differently from their zigzag siblings. They usually feature a band gap that closes under an external in-plane electric field. At some critical value of the field the gap fully closes forming a Dirac cone linear crossing, see Fig. 9d in Ref. This intriguing result have been corroborated by the density functional theory calculations and explained in a simplified tight-binding model. It does not depend on the chemical composition of the ribbon edges, for example both fluorine and chorine atoms can be used for the ribbon edge passivation instead of a usual hydrogen. Also this effect can be induced by chemical co-doping, i.e. by placing nitrogen and boron atoms atop the ribbon at its opposite sides. Modelwise the effect can be explained by a pair of cis-polyacetylene chains placed at a distance corresponding to the ribbon width and subjected to the different gate potentials.

Energy bands of a half-bearded graphene nanoribbon subjected to an in-plane electric field in the continuum model. $F$ is the strength of the field, $\mathrm{Ind}_{\mathrm{tr}}$ is the index of the Dirac equation solution. The index is a winding number of a vector field $\partial_x(\phi_A(x),\phi_B(x))$ along a trajectory representing the spinor solution $(\phi_A(x),\phi_B(x))$ in the Hilbet space $(\phi_A,\phi_B)$.

Bearded ribbons with Klen-type edges behave in the tight-binding model approximation similar to zigzag ribbons. Namely, the band gap opens between the edge states. Due to chemical instability of this type of the edge configuration, such ribbons are normally excluded from the publications. Whether they can at least hypothetically exhibit half-metallicity in external in-plane fields similar to zigzag nanoribbons is not yet clear.

A vast family of cousins of the above ribbons with both similar edges is the class of ribbons combining non-equivalent edge geometries in a single ribbon. One of the simplest examples can be a half-bearded nanoribbon. Such ribbons, in principle, could be more stable than nanoribbons with two bearded edges because they could be realized via asymmetric hydrogenation of zigzag ribbons. In the nearest neighbor tight-binding model and in non-spin-polarized density functional theory calculations such ribbons exhibit chiral anomaly structure. The fully flat band of a pristine half-bearded nanoribbon subjected to the in-plane external electric field demonstrates unidirectional linear dispersions with group velocities of opposite directions around each of the two Dirac points. At high fields, the linear bands around the Dirac points transform into a wiggly cubic-like dispersions. This nontrivial behavior is favorable for the field-tunable dissipationless transport. The drastic transformation from fully flat to linear and then cubic-like band allows for a continuum $\vec{k}\cdot\vec{p}$ model description based on the Dirac equation. The Dirac equation supplemented with the suitable boundary conditions breaking the inversion/mirror symmetry and a single field strength parameter admits an analytic solution in terms of Airy-like special functions.

== Mechanical properties ==
While it is difficult to prepare graphene nanoribbons with precise geometry to conduct the real tensile test due to the limiting resolution in nanometer scale, the mechanical properties of the two most common graphene nanoribbons (zigzag and armchair) were investigated by computational modeling using density functional theory, molecular dynamics, and finite element method. Since the two-dimensional graphene sheet with strong bonding is known to be one of the stiffest materials, graphene nanoribbons Young's modulus also has a value of over 1 TPa.

The Young's modulus, shear modulus and Poisson's ratio of graphene nanoribbons are different with varying sizes (with different length and width) and shapes. These mechanical properties are anisotropic and would usually be discussed in two in-plane directions, parallel and perpendicular to the one-dimensional periodic direction. Mechanical properties here will be a little bit different from the two-dimensional graphene sheets because of the distinct geometry, bond length, and bond strength particularly at the edge of graphene nanoribbons. It is possible to tune these nanomechanical properties with further chemical doping to change the bonding environment at the edge of graphene nanoribbons. While increasing the width of graphene nanoribbons, the mechanical properties will converge to the value measured on the graphene sheets. One analysis predicted the high Young's modulus for armchair graphene nanoribbons to be around 1.24 TPa by the molecular dynamics method. They also showed the nonlinear elastic behaviors with higher-order terms in the stress-strain curve. In the higher strain region, it would need even higher-order (>3) to fully describe the nonlinear behavior. Other scientists also reported the nonlinear elasticity by the finite element method, and found that Young's modulus, tensile strength, and ductility of armchair graphene nanoribbons are all greater than those of zigzag graphene nanoribbons. Another report predicted the linear elasticity for the strain between -0.02 and 0.02 on the zigzag graphene nanoribbons by the density functional theory model. Within the linear region, the electronic properties would be relatively stable under the slightly changing geometry. The energy gaps increase from -0.02 eV to 0.02 eV for the strain between -0.02 and 0.02, which provides the feasibilities for future engineering applications.

The tensile strength of the armchair graphene nanoribbons is 175 GPa with the great ductility of 30.26% fracture strain, which shows the greater mechanical properties comparing to the value of 130 GPa and 25% experimentally measured on monolayer graphene. As expected, graphene nanoribbons with smaller width would completely break down faster, since the ratio of the weaker edged bonds increased. While the tensile strain on graphene nanoribbons reached its maximum, C-C bonds would start to break and then formed much bigger rings to make materials weaker until fracture.

== Optical properties ==
The earliest numerical results on the optical properties of graphene nanoribbons were obtained by Lin and Shyu in 2000. The different selection rules for optical transitions in graphene nanoribbons with armchair and zigzag edges were reported. These results were supplemented by a comparative study of zigzag nanoribbons with single wall armchair carbon nanotubes by Hsu and Reichl in 2007. It was demonstrated that selection rules in zigzag ribbons are different from those in carbon nanotube and the eigenstates in zigzag ribbons can be classified as either symmetric or antisymmetric. Also, it was predicted that edge states should play an important role in the optical absorption of zigzag nanoribbons. Optical transitions between the edge and bulk states should enrich the low-energy region ($<3$ eV) of the absorption spectrum by strong absorption peaks. Analytical derivation of the numerically obtained selection rules was presented in 2011. The selection rule for the incident light polarized parallel (longitudinally) to the zigzag ribbon axis is that $\Delta J = J_2 - J_1$ is odd, where $J_{1}$ and $J_{2}$ enumerate the energy bands, while for the perpendicular polarization $\Delta J$ is even. Intraband (intersubband) transitions between the conduction or valence sub-bands are also allowed in parallel polarization if $\Delta J$ is even. For perpendicular polarization the intraband transitions between the conduction or valence sub-bands are allowed when $\Delta J$ is odd.

Optical selection rules of zigzag graphene nanoribbons

For graphene nanoribbons with armchair edges the selection rules are $\Delta J$ is odd for the perpendicular and $\Delta J = 0$ for the parallel polarization of the incident light. Similar to carbon tubes the intersubband transitions in parallel polarization are forbidden for armchair graphene nanoribbons though they are allowed for the perpendicular polarization and $\Delta J$ being odd. Since energy bands in armchair nanoribbons and zigzag carbon nanotubes can be aligned, when $N_t = 2 N_r + 4$, where $N_t$ and $N_r$ are the numbers of atoms in the unit cell of the tube and ribbon, respectively, the selection rules for parallel polarization give rise to an exact correlation between optical absorption peaks of these two types of nanostructures.

Despite different selection rules in single wall armchair carbon nanotubes and zigzag graphene nanoribbons a hidden correlation of the absorption peaks originating from the bulk states is predicted. The correlation of the absorption peaks in armchair tubes and zigzag ribbons takes place when the matching condition $N_t = 2 N_r + 4$ holds even though the energy bands of such a tube and ribbon do not align precisely. A similar correlation between bulk absorption peaks can be obtained for armchair nanotubes and nanoribbons with bearded edges, but in this case the matching conditions alters to $N_t = 2 N_r + 2$. These results obtained within the nearest-neighbor approximation of the tight-binding model have been corroborated with first principles density functional theory calculations for zigzag nanoribbons and armchair tubes taking into account exchange and correlation effects.

First-principle calculations with quasiparticle corrections and many-body effects explored the electronic and optical properties of graphene-based materials. With GW calculation, the properties of graphene-based materials are accurately investigated, including graphene nanoribbons, edge and surface functionalized armchair graphene nanoribbons and scaling properties in armchair graphene nanoribbons.

== Analyses ==
Graphene nanoribbons can be analyzed by scanning tunneling microscope, Raman spectroscopy, infrared spectroscopy, and X-ray photoelectron spectroscopy. For example, out-of-plane bending vibration of one C-H on one benzene ring, called SOLO, which is similar to zigzag edge, on zigzag GNRs has been reported to appear at 899 cm^{−1}, whereas that of two C-H on one benzene ring, called DUO, which is similar to armchair edge, on armchair GNRs has been reported to appear at 814 cm^{−1} as results of calculated IR spectra. However, analyses of graphene nanoribbon on substrates are difficult using infrared spectroscopy even with a Reflection Absorption Spectrometry method. Thus, a large quantity of graphene nanoribbon is necessary for infrared spectroscopy analyses.

== Reactivity ==
Zigzag edges are known to be more reactive than armchair edges, as observed in the dehydrogenation reactivities between the compound with zigzag edges (tetracene) and armchair edges (chrysene). Also, zigzag edges tends to be more oxidized than armchair edges without gasification. The zigzag edges with longer length can be more reactive as it can be seen from the dependence of the length of acenes on the reactivity.

== Applications ==
=== Polymeric nanocomposites ===
Graphene nanoribbons and their oxidized counterparts called graphene oxide nanoribbons have been investigated as nano-fillers to improve the mechanical properties of polymeric nanocomposites. Increases in the mechanical properties of epoxy composites on loading of graphene nanoribbons were observed. An increase in the mechanical properties of biodegradable polymeric nanocomposites of poly(propylene fumarate) at low weight percentage was achieved by loading of oxidized graphene nanoribbons, fabricated for bone tissue engineering applications.

=== Contrast agent for bioimaging ===
Hybrid imaging modalities, such as photoacoustic (PA) tomography (PAT) and thermoacoustic (TA) tomography (TAT) have been developed for bioimaging applications. PAT/TAT combines advantages of pure ultrasound and pure optical imaging/radio frequency (RF), providing good spatial resolution, great penetration depth and high soft-tissue contrast. GNR synthesized by unzipping single- and multi-walled carbon nanotubes have been reported as contrast agents for photoacoustic and thermoacoustic imaging and tomography.

=== Catalysis ===
In catalysis, GNRs offer several advantageous features that make them attractive as catalysts or catalyst supports. Firstly, their high surface-to-volume ratio provides abundant active sites for catalytic reactions. This enhanced surface area enables efficient interaction with reactant molecules, leading to improved catalytic performance.

Secondly, the edge structure of GNRs plays a crucial role in catalysis. The zigzag and armchair edges of GNRs possess distinctive electronic properties, making them suitable for specific reactions. For instance, the presence of unsaturated carbon atoms at the edges can serve as active sites for adsorption and reaction of various molecules.

Moreover, GNRs can be functionalized or doped with heteroatoms to tailor their catalytic properties further. Functionalization with specific groups or doping with elements like silicon, nitrogen, boron, or transition metals can introduce additional active sites or modify the electronic structure, allowing for selective catalytic transformations.

== See also ==
- Graphene oxide paper
- Katsunori Wakabayashi
- Silicene, which can also form nanoribbons
- Graphene electronics
- Graphene helix
