= Science and Technology of Advanced Materials =

Scientific journal

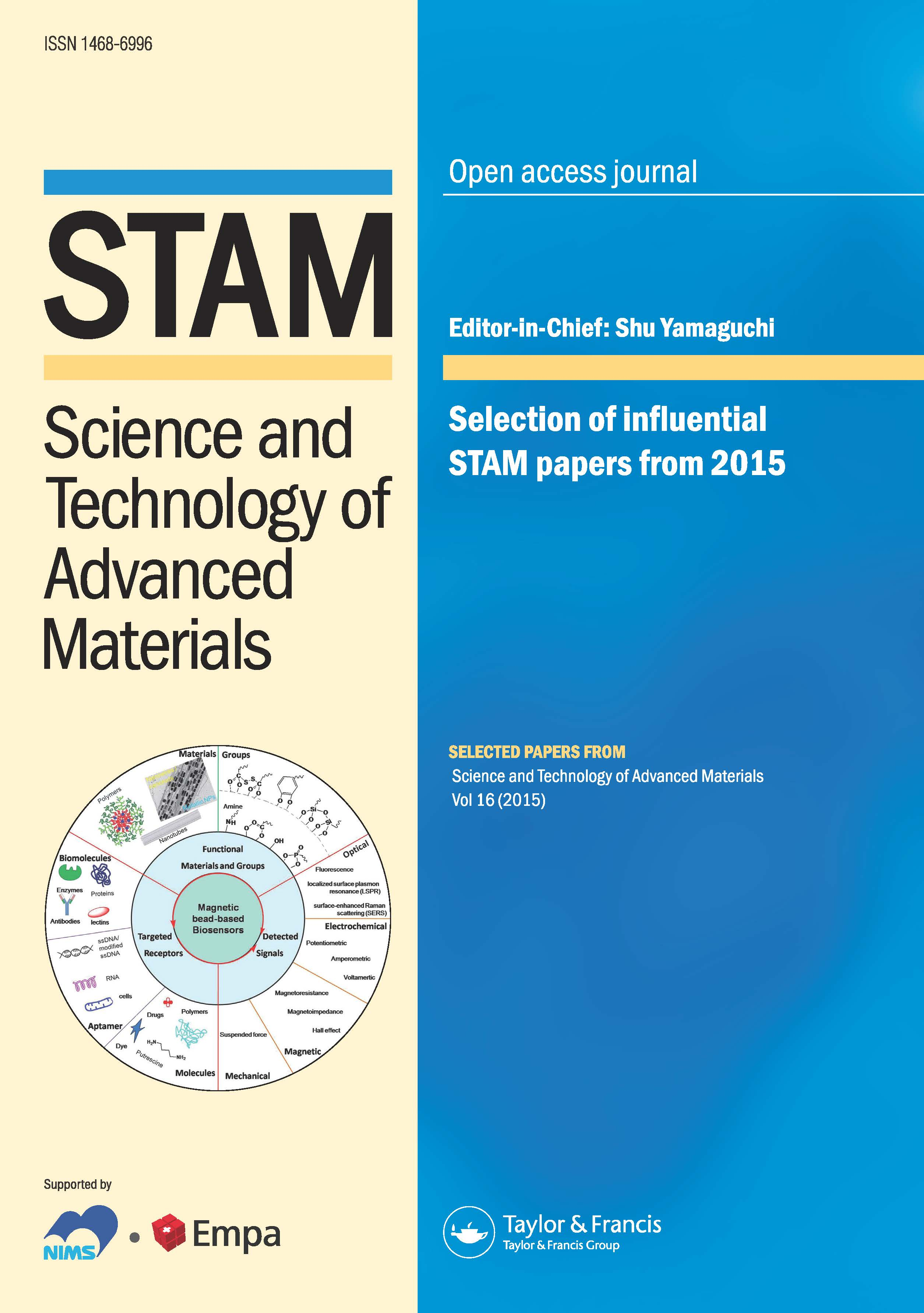
- Discipline: Materials science
- Language: English
- Edited by: Kazuhiro Hono

Publication details
- History: 2000–present
- Publisher: Taylor & Francis (2016–); IOP Publishing (2008–2015); Elsevier (2000–2008)
- Frequency: Continuous
- Open access: Yes
- License: CC BY
- Impact factor: 6.6 (2025)

Standard abbreviations
- ISO 4: Sci. Technol. Adv. Mater.

Indexing
- CODEN: STAMCV
- ISSN: 1468-6996 (print); 1878-5514 (web)
- LCCN: 00200486
- OCLC no.: 44189485

Links
- Journal homepage

Science and Technology of Advanced Materials is a peer-reviewed scientific journal in materials science that was established in 2000. In 2008 it became an open access journal through the sponsorship of the National Institute for Materials Science (NIMS). The journal is international; it is managed by NIMS, which was joined in 2014 by the Swiss Federal Laboratories for Materials Science and Technology (Empa). Currently STAM is an electronic journal, its articles are continuously published online. Its sister journal, STAM Methods, has been launched in 2021.

== Scope ==
The journal covers all aspects of materials science, including theoretical analysis, synthesis and processing, phase and structure analyses, characterization, properties, engineering, and applications. It covers advances in research on solids, liquids and colloids, with emphasis on the interdisciplinary nature of materials science and issues at the forefront of the field, such as nano-, bio- and eco- and energy materials.

== License and fees ==
Since March 2014, STAM articles are published under a Creative Commons CC BY license, while the previous content is either copyrighted or released within a non-commercial CC BY-NC-SA platform.

== Indexing ==
STAM is indexed by major databases including the Astrophysics Data System, Chemical Abstracts Service, Inspec, PubMed, Science Citation Index, Scopus and Web of Science.

== Impact ==
According to the Journal Citation Reports, STAM has a 2025 impact factor of 6.6.

STAM has published articles and editorials by the Nobel Laureates Ei-ichi Negishi, Heinrich Rohrer and Dan Shechtman.
