= Vikas Berry =

Indian-American chemical engineer (born 1977)

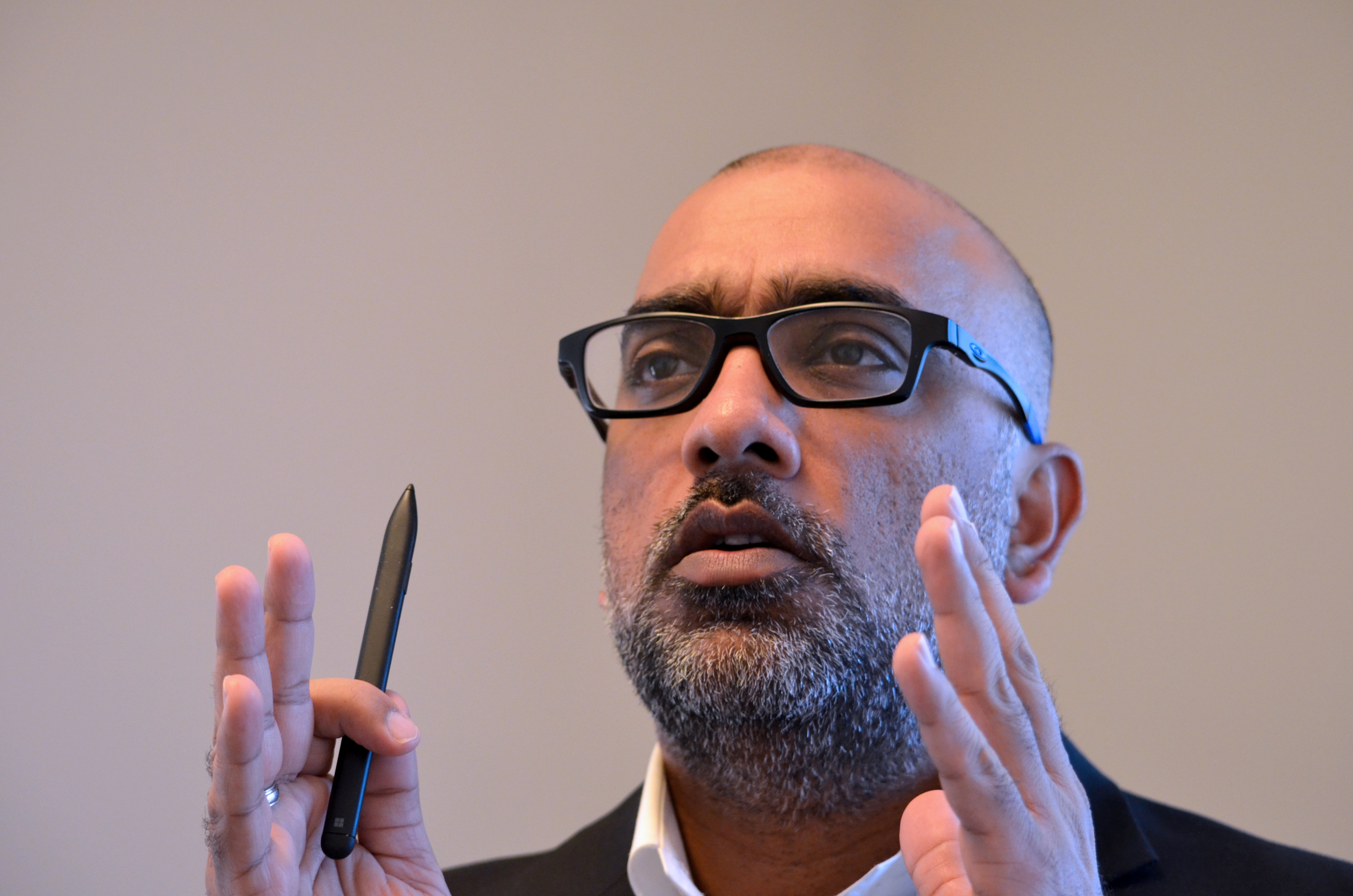
- Born: 1977 (age 48–49); Pune, India
- Education: Virginia Tech; University of Kansas; Indian Institute of Technology Delhi
- Known for: Graphene; 2D materials bionanotechnology Sustainable Energy
- Scientific career
- Fields: Chemical Engineering; Molecular engineering Sustainability; Nanotechnology
- Workplaces: University of Illinois Chicago

Vikas Berry (born 1977 in Pune, India) is an Indian-American chemical engineer and entrepreneur. He is a professor of Chemical Engineering at the University of Illinois Chicago, where he was the department head for 10 years. He is also the CEO at Argo Graphene Solutions Corp. His work focuses on the synthesis, chemical modification, scalable manufacturing and applications of two-dimensional materials such as graphene and graphene nanoribbons. He holds the Dr. Satish C. and Asha Saxena professorship at the University of Illinois Chicago, and previously held the William H. Honstead endowed professorship at Kansas State University from 2011 to 2014.

== Background and education ==
Berry grew up in New Delhi, India and graduated from TAPS-Delhi in 1995. He received his bachelor's degree in chemical engineering from the Indian Institute of Technology-Delhi in 1999. Then, after working with Cadila Pharmaceuticals, he continued his education with a master's degree from the University of Kansas in 2003, and a doctorate from Virginia Polytechnic Institute and State University in 2006.

== Research and entrepreneurship ==
Berry's research focuses on the synthesis, processing, and scalable manufacturing of graphene and other two-dimensional materials. He has developed methods for producing graphene quantum dots and graphene nanoribbons through structural transformation of graphite, a process referred to as graphite nanotomy. His work also includes direct chemical vapor deposition of graphene on dielectric substrates, integration of boron nitride sheets with graphene to form heterostructures, and the development of graphene-based sensing and electronic platforms.

Berry co-founded Grapherry. The company has reported collaborations with battery manufacturers to evaluate graphene for anode materials. Berry is the Chief Executive Officer of Argo Graphene Solutions Corp that licensed the STREAM technology developed by Grapherry.
