= Thermoacoustic imaging =

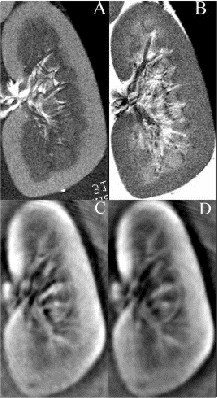
Fig. 1. Bottom: The first 3D thermoaoustic images of biologic tissue (lamb kidney). Top: MRIs of the same kidney.

Thermoacoustic imaging was originally proposed by Theodore Bowen in 1981 as a strategy for studying the absorption properties of human tissue using virtually any kind of electromagnetic radiation. But Alexander Graham Bell first reported the physical principle upon which thermoacoustic imaging is based a century earlier. He observed that audible sound could be created by illuminating an intermittent beam of sunlight onto a rubber sheet. Shortly after Bowen's work was published, other researchers proposed methodology for thermoacoustic imaging using microwaves. In 1994 researchers used an infrared laser to produce the first thermoacoustic images of near-infrared optical absorption in a tissue-mimicking phantom, albeit in two dimensions (2D). In 1995 other researchers formulated a general reconstruction algorithm by which 2D thermoacoustic images could be computed from their "projections," i.e. thermoacoustic computed tomography (TCT). By 1998 researchers at Indiana University Medical Center extended TCT to 3D and employed pulsed microwaves to produce the first fully three-dimensional (3D) thermoacoustic images of biologic tissue [an excised lamb kidney (Fig. 1)]. The following year they created the first fully 3D thermoacoustic images of cancer in the human breast, again using pulsed microwaves (Fig. 2). Since that time, thermoacoustic imaging has gained widespread popularity in research institutions worldwide. As of 2008, three companies were developing commercial thermoacoustic imaging systems – Seno Medical, Endra, Inc. and OptoSonics, Inc.

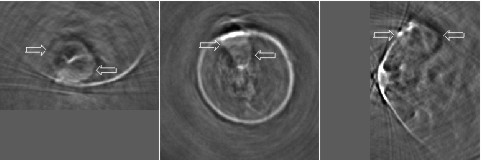
Fig. 2: First 3D thermoacoustic image of breast cancer. From left to right: axial, coronal and sagittal views of the cancer (arrows).

== Thermoacoustic wave production ==
Sound, which propagates as a pressure wave, can be induced in virtually any material, including biologic tissue, whenever time-varying electromagnetic energy is absorbed. The stimulating radiation that induces these thermally generated acoustic waves may lie anywhere in the electromagnetic spectrum, from high-energy ionizing particles to low-energy radio waves. The term "photoacoustic" (see photoacoustic imaging in biomedicine) applies to this phenomenon when the stimulating radiation is optical, while "thermoacoustic" is the more general term and refers to all radiating sources, including optical.

The process by which thermoacoustic waves are generated is depicted in Figure 3. It can be understood as a four-step process:

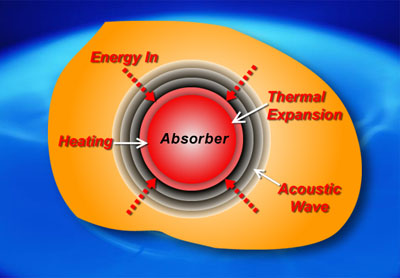
Fig. 3. Schematic illustration of thermoacoustic imaging

1. Biologic tissue is irradiated by an energy source that is absorbed by the body. The source of energy is non-specific, but typically consists of visible light, near infrared, radio waves or microwaves.
2. The absorbed energy is converted to heat, which raises the temperature of the tissue, typically by less than 0.001 degree Celsius.
3. The increase in the temperature of the tissue causes the tissue to expand in volume, however slightly.
4. This mechanical expansion produces an acoustic wave that propagates outward in all directions from the site of energy absorption at the velocity of sound in biologic tissue, approximately 1.5 mm per microsecond.

When the tissue is irradiated with a pulse, the acoustic frequencies that characterize the acoustic wave span a range from zero to 1/(pulse width). E.g., a 1 microsecond pulse produces acoustic frequencies from zero to approximately 1 megahertz (MHz). Shorter pulses produce a wider range of acoustic frequencies. Frequencies greater than 1 MHz are referred to as ultrasonic, and are also associated with medical ultrasound applications.

== Image formation principles ==
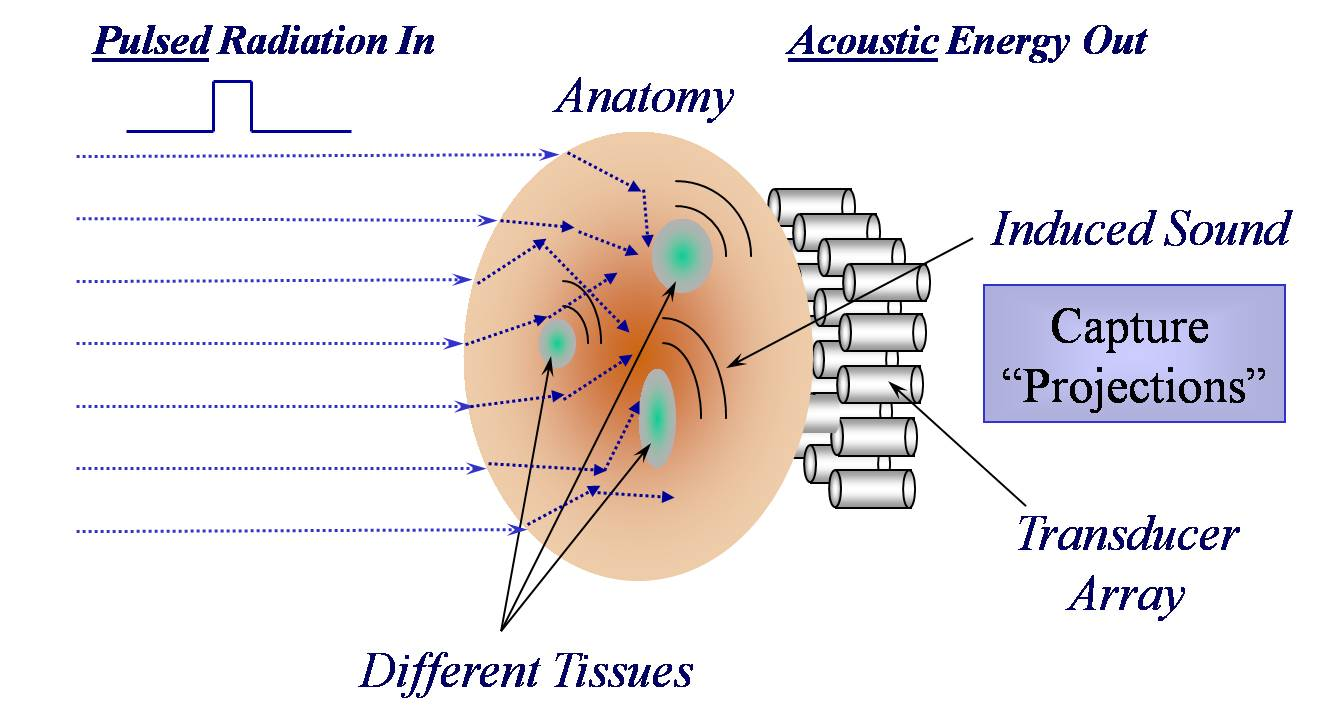
Fig. 4: Generic thermoacoustic imaging instrumentation

Any thermoacoustic imaging device requires a source of electromagnetic radiation, be it a laser or a microwave antenna, to deliver energy to the anatomy being studied, and one or more acoustic detectors coupled acoustically to the outside surface of the anatomy, as is illustrated in Fig. 4.

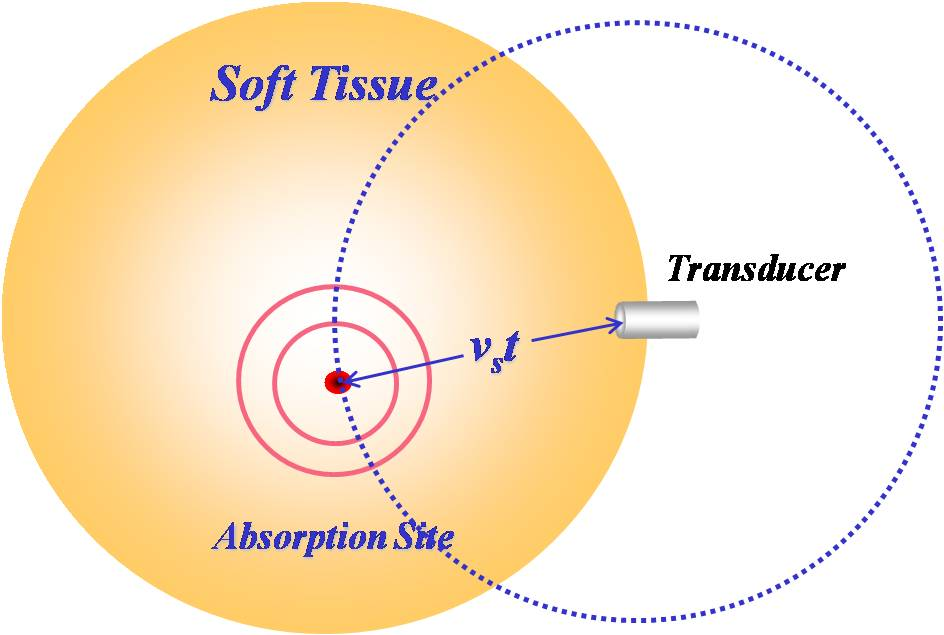
Fig. 5: For a given time of flight (t) acoustic waves will arrive at a transducer from all absorbers equidistant from the transducer (dotted blue line).

The typical acoustic detector is an ultrasound transducer, which is commonly made of a piezo-electric material that converts detected pressure to an electrical signal. Thermoacoustic waves are induced within the anatomy wherever absorption takes place, and the strength of these thermoacoustic waves is proportional to the energy absorbed within the tissue. Some of these waves propagate through the anatomy over some time interval (time-of-flight) before being detected by one or more of the acoustic transducers. The exact time-of-flight is proportional to the distance between an absorption site and a transducer, assuming for the moment that each transducer is a point detector. For any given time-of-flight, each transducer will receive the sum of the thermoacoustic waves originating at the same distance from the detector in question as is illustrated in Fig. 5. For this reason, ambiguity arises when attempting to localize an absorption site with a point transducer. A variety of strategies have been employed to mitigate this ambiguity.

=== Detector geometries ===
Three generic detector configurations have been used: a spherically focused transducer; a linear (or curve-linear) array of transducers, focused in one dimension; or, a 2D array of unfocused transducers. In general, a single, focused transducer can image a single line through a 3D volume. A linear (1D) array, be it straight or curved, can image a 2D plane, but to image a full 3D volume requires a 2D array of transducers.

==== Focused Transducer ====
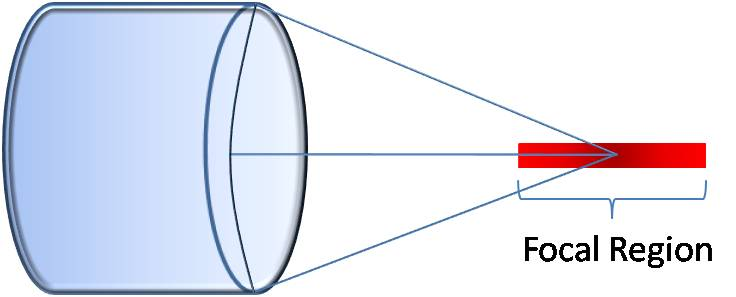
Fig. 6: Spherically focused transducer

A spherically focused transducer is most sensitive to thermoacoustic waves originating along a line passing through its focal point. Time-of-flight information is used to estimate the thermoacoustic signal strength along this line. A 2D image can be assembled a line-at-a-time by translating the focused transducer laterally along a linear path. A 3D image can be built up by scanning the transducer along a rectilinear path within a 2D plane. The ability to distinguish thermoacoustic signals along the line of focus (axial resolution) is superior to distinguishing thermoacoustic signals transverse to the line of focus (lateral resolution). For this reason the lateral spatial resolution is three- to four-times worse than the axial spatial resolution using this approach.

==== Linear array ====
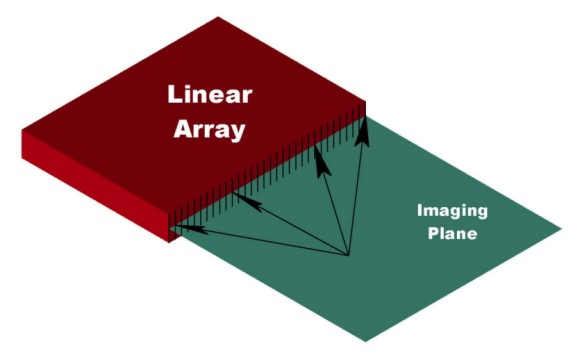
Fig. 7: Linear transducer array used to image a 2D plane

Linear transducer arrays (both curved and straight) are commonly used in conventional medical ultrasound. They are available in a wide variety of sizes and shapes. They are easily adapted for use in thermoacoustic imaging. Figure 7 illustrates how a linear array is used for 2D thermoacoustic imaging. The array consists of a number of elements (64 - 256) that are focused in the vertical dimension to maintain maximum sensitivity within a 2D plane extending outward from the front face of the array. Thermoacoustic signals within the plane are localized by calculating the times-of-flight from each position within the plane to each element of the array (arrows, Fig. 7).

==== 2D array ====
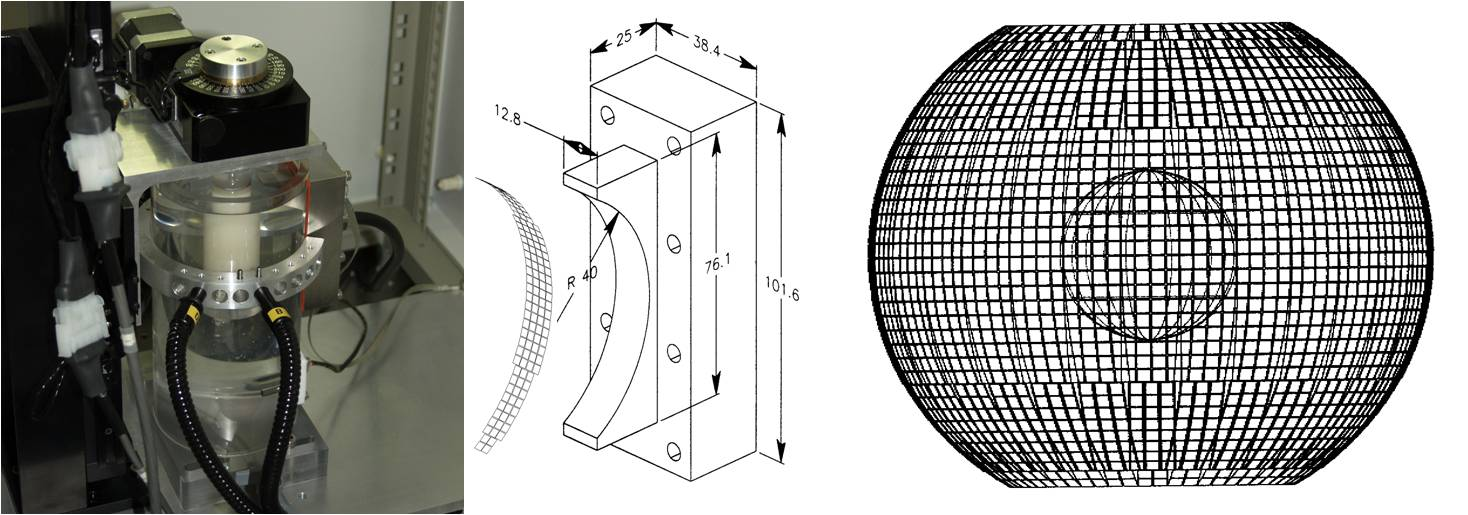
Fig. 8: First 3D thermoacoustic small animal scanner

Fig. 9: 3D TCT image of vasculature in the head of a mouse

In order to capture sufficient thermoacoustic data to form an accurate 3D map of electromagnetic absorption, it is necessary to surround the anatomy being imaged with a 2D array of transducers. The world's first 3D thermoacoustic animal scanner (Fig. 8: left panel) accomplished this by combining a cylindrical array of 128 transducers (Fig. 8: center panel) with rotation of the animal being imaged about the vertical axis. The net result was to capture thermoacoustic data over the surface of a sphere surrounding the animal being imaged (Fig. 8: right panel). This device was capable of visualizing structures as small as 1/3 millimeter. An animated 3D image of the vasculature in the head of a mouse is displayed in Fig. 9. This animated image was acquired using near infrared radiation at 800 nm, where optical absorption by blood is higher than surrounding tissues. Therefore, the vasculature is preferentially visualized. Microwaves have also been used to form 3D thermoacoustic images of the human breast. One of the first devices to do so is depicted in Fig. 10. It consisted of an array of eight waveguides, which directed microwave energy into the breast. A transducer array was rotated in synchrony with the waveguides in order to acquire sufficient data to reconstruct the internal structures of the breast. Figure 11 shows an animation of the typical glandular tissue pattern in a normal breast.

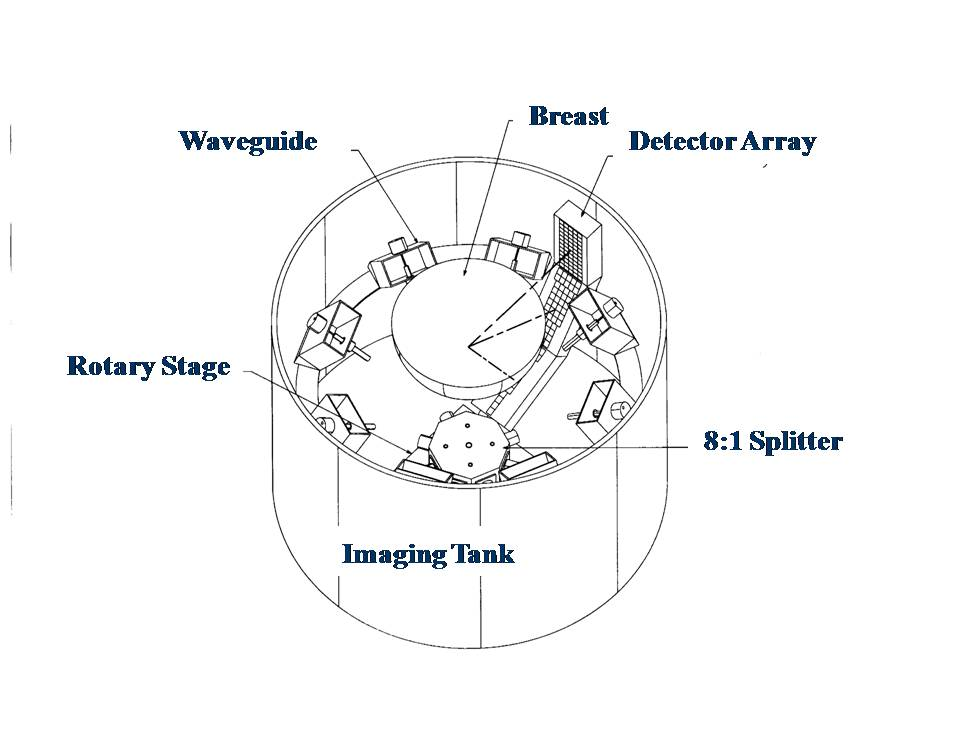
Fig. 10: Schematic drawing of world's first 3D thermoaocustic breast scanner

Fig. 11: 3D thermoacoustic image of the human breast using microwaves to visualize normal glandular breast tissue
