= Mitsutaka Fujita =

Japanese physicist (1959–1998)

- Born: August 16, 1959; Niihama, Ehime
- Died: March 18, 1998 (aged 38)
- Known for: graphene nanoribbon theory
- Awards: Best Paper Award 2003, Physical Society of Japan
- Scientific career
- Fields: Nanotechnology

Mitsutaka Fujita (藤田 光孝, Fujita Mitsutaka; August 16, 1959 – March 18, 1998) was a Japanese physicist. He proposed the edge state that is unique to graphene zigzag edges. Also, he theoretically pointed out the importance and peculiarity of nanoscale and edge shape effects in nanographene. The theoretical concept of graphene nanoribbons was introduced by him and his research group to study the nanoscale effect of graphene. He was an associate professor at Tsukuba University, and died of a subarachnoid hemorrhage on March 18, 1998. His posthumous name is Rikakuin-Shinju-Houkou-Koji (理覚院深珠放光居士) in Japanese.

== Awards ==
After his death, the original paper on graphene edge state and graphene nanoribbons was awarded the JPS Best Paper Award in March 2003 from the Physical Society of Japan.

- JPS Best Paper award, Physical Society of Japan

== Representative publications ==
- Fujita, M.; Wakabayashi, K.; Nakada, K.; Kusakabe, K. (1996). "Peculiar Localized State at Zigzag Graphite Edge". J. Phys. Soc. Jpn. 65 (7): 1920–1923. Bibcode:1996JPSJ...65.1920F. doi:10.1143/JPSJ.65.1920.
- Nakada, K.; Fujita, M.; Dresselhaus, G.; Dresselhaus, M.S. (1996). "Edge state in graphene ribbons: Nanometer size effect and edge shape dependence". Phys. Rev. B. 54 (24): 17954–17961. Bibcode:1996PhRvB..5417954N. doi:10.1103/PhysRevB.54.17954. PMID 9985930.
- Wakabayashi, K.; Fujita, M.; Ajiki, H.; Sigrist, M. (1999). "Electronic and magnetic properties of nanographite ribbons". Phys. Rev. B. 59 (12): 8271–8282. arXiv:cond-mat/9809260. Bibcode:1999PhRvB..59.8271W. doi:10.1103/PhysRevB.59.8271. S2CID 119523846.
- Saito, R.; Fujita, M.; Dresselhaus, G.; Dresselhaus, M.S. (1992). "Electronic structure of graphene tubules based on C_{60}". Phys. Rev. B. 46 (3): 1804–1811. Bibcode:1992PhRvB..46.1804S. doi:10.1103/physrevb.46.1804. PMID 10003828.
- Saito, R.; Fujita, M.; Dresselhaus, G.; Dresselhaus, M.S. (1992). "Electronic structure of chiral graphene tubules". Appl. Phys. Lett. 60 (18): 2204–2206. Bibcode:1992ApPhL..60.2204S. doi:10.1063/1.107080.
- Miyamoto, Y.; Nakada, K.; Fujita, M. (1999). "First-principles study of edge states of H-terminated graphitic ribbons". Phys. Rev. B. 59 (15): 9858–9861. Bibcode:1999PhRvB..59.9858M. doi:10.1103/physrevb.59.9858.
- Fujita, M.; Igami, M.; Nakada, K. (1997). "Lattice Distortion in Nanographite Ribbons". J. Phys. Soc. Jpn. 66 (7): 1864–1867. Bibcode:1997JPSJ...66.1864F. doi:10.1143/jpsj.66.1864.
- Ogitsu, T.; Miyazaki, T.; Fujita, M.; Okazaki, M. (1995). "Role of Hydrogen in C and Si (001) Homoepitaxy". Phys. Rev. Lett. 75 (23): 4226–4229. Bibcode:1995PhRvL..75.4226O. doi:10.1103/physrevlett.75.4226. PMID 10059851.
- Kato, M.; Machida, K.; Nakanishi, H.; Fujita, M. (1990). "Soliton Lattice Modulation of Incommensurate Spin Density Wave in Two Dimensional Hubbard Model – A Mean Field Study –". J. Phys. Soc. Jpn. 59 (3): 1047–1058. Bibcode:1990JPSJ...59.1047K. doi:10.1143/jpsj.59.1047.
- Machida, K.; Fujita, M. (1984). "Soliton lattice structure of incommensurate spin-density waves: Application to Cr and Cr-rich Cr-Mn and Cr-V alloys". Phys. Rev. B. 30 (9): 5284–5299. Bibcode:1984PhRvB..30.5284M. doi:10.1103/physrevb.30.5284.
- Nakao, K.; Kurita, N.; Fujita, M. (1994). "Ab initio molecular-orbital calculation for C70 and seven isomers of C80". Phys. Rev. B. 49 (16): 11415–11420. Bibcode:1994PhRvB..4911415N. doi:10.1103/physrevb.49.11415. PMID 10009995.
- Fujita, M.; Saito, R.; Dresselhaus, G.; Dresselhaus, M.S. (1992). "Formation of general fullerenes by their projection on a honeycomb lattice". Phys. Rev. B. 45 (23): 13834–13836. Bibcode:1992PhRvB..4513834F. doi:10.1103/physrevb.45.13834. PMID 10001498.
- Machida, K.; Fujita, M. (1986). "Quantum energy spectra and one-dimensional quasiperiodic systems". Phys. Rev. B. 34 (10): 7367–7370. Bibcode:1986PhRvB..34.7367M. doi:10.1103/physrevb.34.7367. PMID 9939394.
- Harigaya, K.; Fujita, M. (1993). "Dimerization structures of metallic and semiconducting fullerene tubules". Phys. Rev. B. 47 (24): 16563–16569. arXiv:cond-mat/9212036. Bibcode:1993PhRvB..4716563H. doi:10.1103/physrevb.47.16563. PMID 10006093. S2CID 119072384.
- Yoshida, M.; Fujita, M.; Fowler, P.W.; Kirby, E.C. (1997). "Non-bonding orbitals in graphite, carbon tubules, toroids and fullerenes". J. Chem. Soc., Faraday Trans. 93 (6): 1037–1043. CiteSeerX 10.1.1.130.3943. doi:10.1039/a607401d.

== See also ==
- Graphite
- Graphene oxide paper
- Carbon nanotubes
- Katsunori Wakabayashi
