= Graphene helix =

Structure consisting of a two-dimensional sheet of graphene wrapped into a helix

A graphene helix is a structure consisting of a two-dimensional sheet of graphene wrapped into a helix, similar to the carbon nanotube. These graphene sheets can have multiple layers, called multi-walled carbon structures, that add to these helices thus increasing their tensile strength but increasing the difficulty of manufacturing. Using van der Waals interactions, it can make structures within one another.

== Electrical and magnetic properties ==
=== Electrical ===
Graphene has a number of unique electrical properties. Carbon nanotubes are semimetals, meaning they are either metallic or semiconducting along the helical axis, depending on the curvature of the graphene helix. Graphene is a "zero-overlap semimetal". Carbon helixes allow high electrical transfer over a three-dimensional plane. The tensile strength, electrical conductivity, and thermal management make it useful in biotechnology.

=== Magnetic ===
Similar to the electrical properties electrical fields can be used on a graphene sheet to polarize the bonds and exclusively bond on one side of the graphene sheet.

=== Thermal ===
Graphene has a high thermal conductivity, whilst also having high insulation perpendicular to the helical axis. These graphene sheets have a thermal conductivity of 3500 W·m^{−1}·K^{−1}, where copper has one of only 385 W·m^{−1}·K^{−1} .

== Physical properties ==
With the different electrical, magnetic, and thermal properties shows that graphene by itself has many unique characteristics that can be harvested when used as a three dimensional structure. These graphene sheets have a tensile strength of 130,000,000,000 pascals which when compared to 400,000,000 pascals that of industrial steel. This shows the possibilities of what this substance can be used for. Graphene is light when compared to materials like industrial steel because it weighs 0.77 milligrams per square meter. Each of these sheets of graphene are made by single atom wide carbon chains cross linking. These webs of carbon chains look like pages of two dimensional hexagons with the only third dimension being only a single atom wide.

== Production ==
=== Early synthesis of graphene ===
One of the first ways that graphene was discovered was taking a piece of masking tape and placing it on a piece of carbon and pulling it off to reveal many small two dimensional graphene sheets. By fabricating graphene with tape does it does create the necessary conditions for these graphene sheets to have the tensile strength previously stated.

=== Mass production of graphene ===
The practicality of using tape to separate these sheets from each other does not scale to the production that would be necessary with the new developments of graphene. This becomes a new issue as the quality of the sheets completely determines what can be done with them. At a larger scale graphene can come from chemically exfoliated, natural, mined graphite.

=== Production of graphene helixes ===
==== Arc discharge and laser ablation ====
These two slightly different processes both have graphene being combusted with electrical currents or by a laser and the graphene helixes will develop when the gaseous phases are separated, but there will need to be excess metals as catalysts.

==== Chemical vapor deposition ====
Generally viewed as a process that has the most promise for the future, the graphene helixes can be formed as catalysts are pushed onto the graphene sheets and will create the emerging helix. While needed to be performed at high temperatures, the process can easily be activated and deactivated purely by the development of the helical structure.

== Medical applications ==
=== Sequencing ===
One of the most interesting applications of a graphene helix would be new ways of unwinding RNA and DNA and using graphene helix's to image these folded apart strands for further sequencing. Having these RNA and XNA bonds pulled apart inside of these graphene helix structures causes the hydrogen bonds to stay intact for more nanoseconds than previously so the sequencing would be more intact. The graphene helix was allowing the XNA to keep its three dimensional structure and allows for the hydrogen bonds to last longer. Overall the thermal and electrical conductivity of these carbon structures has too many different uses because of their strength and weight.

=== Electrocapillary ===
Helical graphene tubes have the electrical and physical properties and in addition to the elasticity can fit into smaller capillary systems. These graphene helixes potentially can be used in nano-fluid systems with uses of both actuators and fiber shaped sensors.

=== Future outlook ===
These carbon helixes display physical properties that could make the creation of nanostructures more of a possibility. With possibilities in the 3D printing field of nanotechnologies, they could provide the scaffolding for future supercapacitors, implants, and energy storage. As the world is decreasing components in size, computers are the fastest to take advantage of new materials, by miniaturizing more electronics even down to the basic wire carrying electricity. There already have been logic gates made by these carbon structures showing the future potential in such material.

=== Nodal morphology ===
Lee et al. suggested unique "nodal morphology" as evidence for the helix model for SWNTs, which prevails in high-resolution transmission electron microscopy (HRTEM) and scanning tunneling microscopy (STM) images reported since 1993. The helix model for SWNTs is supported by strain energy calculation. The strain energy of the helical growth of a zigzag or armchair graphene ribbon is just about a quarter that of seamless cylindrical SWNTs. This calculation suggests that the growth of seamless SWNTs may be energetically prohibitive and uncompetitive with the structure proposed here under the conditions of conventional chemical vapor deposition processes. The model addresses previous experimental evidence in the literature, diverse electron diffraction patterns, HRTEM and STM morphologies as well as inconsistencies in the measured mechanical and electrical properties of SWNTs. Electrical property of SWNTs can be regarded as a (zigzag) graphene nanoribbon which is a conductor. In the mode, the chirality is not a necessary condition for the growth of SWNTs and the observation of chirality (or semiconducting properties) in the literature may be the result of an erroneous interpretation of the distortion of the graphene helix.

Based on spiral growth model, further works were carried out to investigate the mechanical properties (evaluation of tensile process by stress distribution).

Recently, Park et al. reinterpreted SWNTs to be a graphene helix via Raman spectroscopy, showing that the typical Raman spectrum for SWNTs is the signature of their helical structure with density functional theory simulation and structure analysis for hydrogenated and dehydrogenated SWNTs samples. They demonstrated that the G- mode at ~1570 cm-1 is unique to opened tubular graphene structures (i.e., graphene helix) of ~2 nm in diameter. They also demonstrate that D mode of ~1350 cm-1 is originated from edge defects of opened SWNTs revealing strong Eigenvectors, which is absent in concentric tubes. They also showed that the analysis for the Raman spectra of SWNTs is consistent with general understanding on Raman analysis of carbon materials.
