= International Center for Materials Nanoarchitectonics =

Japanese research unit

Coordinates: 36.06979°N 140.13236°E

International Center for Materials Nanoarchitectonics (MANA from MAterials NanoArchitectonics) is a special research unit established in 2007 at the National Institute for Materials Science (NIMS) within the World Premier International (WPI) Research Center Initiative by the Japan Society for the Promotion of Science (JSPS).

== Members ==
MANA brings together outstanding researchers from Japan and other countries to conduct research at NIMS. The organizations providing foreign researchers are named "satellites" and currently include

- University of Cambridge (UK)
- University of California (US)
- Georgia Institute of Technology (US)
- CNRS (France)
- University of Tsukuba (Japan)
- Tokyo University of Science (Japan) and
- Hokkaido University (Japan).

MANA advisors include Nobel Prize laureates Harold Kroto and Heinrich Rohrer, as well as other prominent scientists (C. N. R. Rao, Galen D. Stucky, etc.) and industry leaders (L. Schlapbach, CEO of Empa).

MANA members include such recognized scientists as Omar M. Yaghi, Christoph Gerber, James Gimzewski, Mark Welland and others.

MANA currently (September 2008) employs only several tens members, originating from at least 9 countries (Japan, UK, US, China, India, Russia, France, Italy and Sweden). However, the number of employees is planned to increase up to about 200.

== Purpose and structure ==
The purpose of establishing MANA is very unusual for a scientific institution in a way that a relatively small unit (MANA, about 50 employees) is put forward to lead the research of a large scientific body (NIMS, about 1500 employees). In fact, MANA is considered as a mechanism of reorganization of the whole research system of NIMS. Consequently, young scientists from all over the world are hired to conduct research, and the senior scientists are invited to guide them. Despite very young age of MANA, results have already been obtained and published in major journals, such as Nature and Science, and more are expected to come in the near future.

Another unusual feature of MANA is that although it is located in Japan and most its employees are Japanese, its primary language is English. This feature reflects the initiative of NIMS to become a leading and truly international scientific center.

== Research directions ==
The research directions of MANA are based on the concept named nanoarchitectonics - a technology allowing to manipulate a group of atoms or molecules. Consequently, much effort is devoted to the synthesis and characterization of various nanomaterials and nanostructures with the results published in the main scientific journals and the MANA research and MANA news pages.

== Scientific cooperation ==
In September 2008, MANA embarked on a new program of scientific cooperation with the Yonsei University in Seoul, Korea. The exchange of researchers and research information between the two institutions is projected as a crucial factor in collaborative research on the development and evaluation of sustainable chemical technology and nano-biofusion technology.
