= La Siesta, Memory of Spain =

1868 painting by Gustave Doré

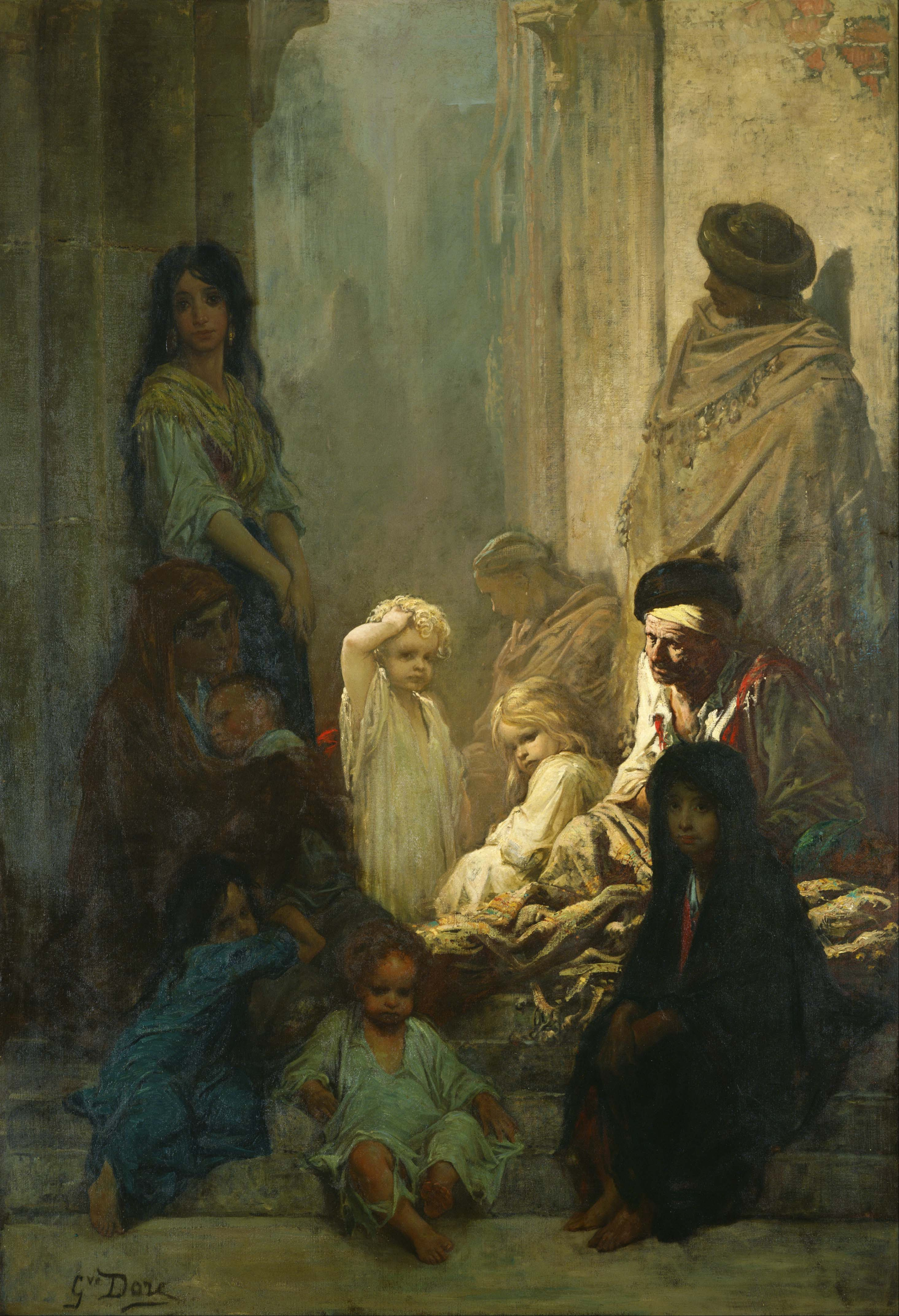
- Artist: Gustave Doré
- Year: 1868
- Medium: Oil on canvas
- Dimensions: 109.48 cm × 75.51 cm (43.10 in × 29.73 in)
- Location: National Museum of Western Art, Tokyo

La Siesta, Memory of Spain is an oil-on-canvas painting by the French artist Gustave Doré, from 1868. The work is housed in the National Museum of Western Art, in Tokyo. It reflects Doré’s interest in Spanish culture following his travels in Spain during the 1860s.

== Provenance ==
Sold at Christie’s, London, on 29 November 1991 (lot 50); it was subsequently part of the Ishizuka Collection, Tokyo; and acquired by the NMWA in 2006.
