= Japan Society for the Promotion of Science =

Administrative agency in Japan

Coordinates: 35°41′13.78″N 139°44′25.37″E

- Nihon Gakujutsu Shinkō Kai (Gakushin)

Agency overview
- Formed: 1932
- Jurisdiction: Government of Japan
- Headquarters: Tokyo, Japan
- Annual budget: 2011 fiscal year ¥334.7 billion
- Agency executive: President, Tsuyoshi Sugino
- Parent agency: Ministry of Education, Culture, Sports, Science and Technology
- Website: www.jsps.go.jp/english/

The Japan Society for the Promotion of Science (日本学術振興会, Nihon Gakujutsu Shinkō Kai; JSPS) is an Independent Administrative Institution in Japan, established for the purpose of contributing to the advancement of science in all fields of the natural and social sciences and the humanities.

== History ==
The Japan Society for the Promotion of Science was founded in 1932 as a non-profit foundation through an endowment granted by Emperor Shōwa. JSPS became a quasi-governmental organization in 1967 under the auspices of the Ministry of Education, Science, Sports and Culture (Monbusho), and after 2001 under the Ministry of Education, Culture, Sports, Science and Technology. In 2003, JSPS entered a new phase with its conversion to an Independent Administrative Institution. This new administrative configuration is intended to become a step towards improving the effectiveness and efficiency of JSPS's management, which in turn should help to improve the quality of the services which are offered to individual researchers, universities, and research institutes.

== Publications ==
A number of publications are made available under the imprimatur of JSPS:

- Gakujutsu Geppo (Japanese Scientific Monthly), a monthly magazine containing scientific readings and articles on Japanese science policy and scientific activities and research trends in governmental and academic organizations in Japan.
- Information re: Japanese universities, research institutions, and their various research activities.
- Scientific books.

== See also ==
- List of Independent Administrative Institutions (Japan)
- List of National Laboratories (Japan)
- Mathematical Society of Japan
- Japan Society for Industrial and Applied Mathematics
- Japan Society of Applied Physics
