= National Institute for Japanese Language and Linguistics =

Japanese independent administrative institution

Coordinates: 35.71084°N 139.40993°E

- 国立国語研究所
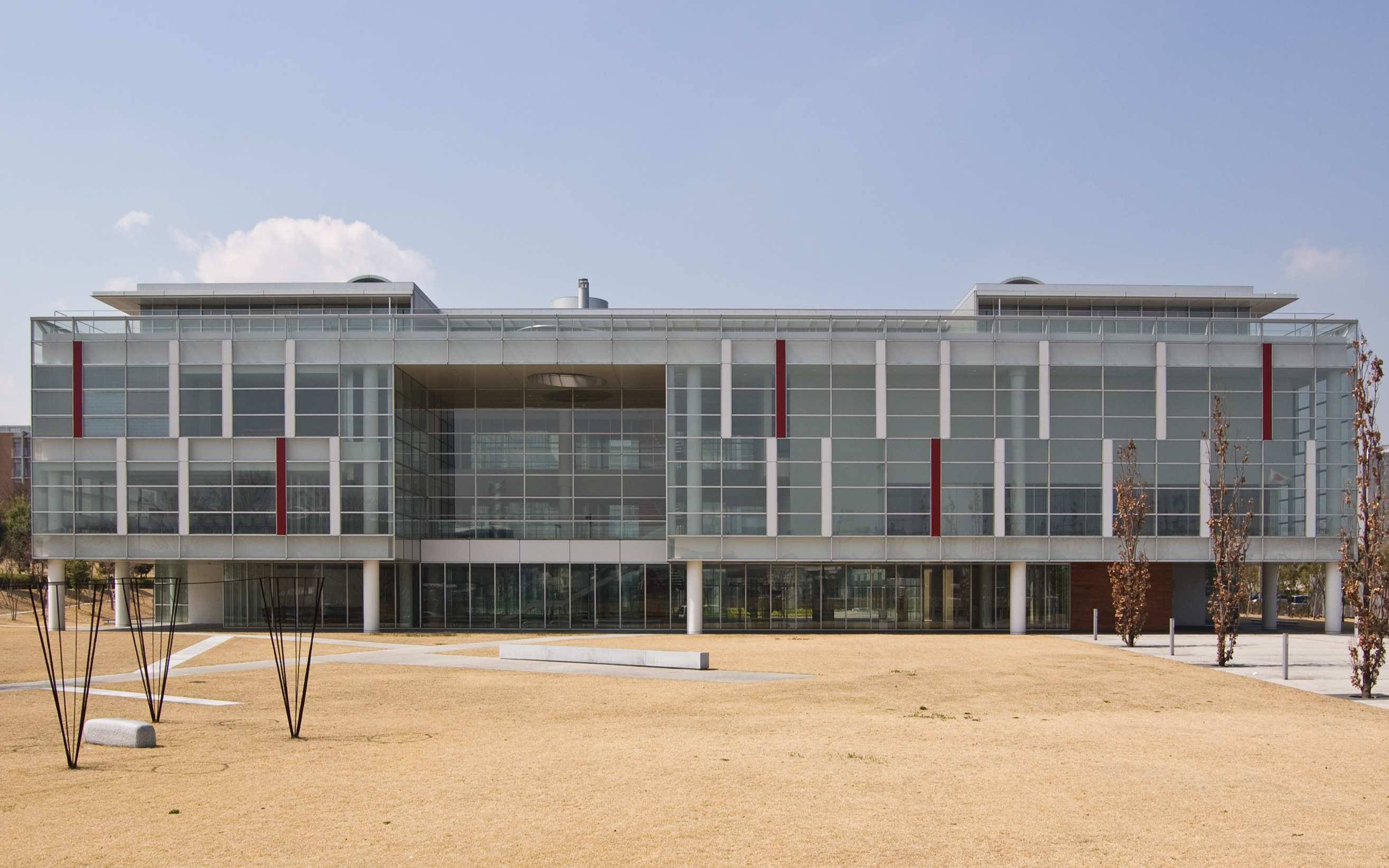

Agency overview
- Formed: 1948
- Jurisdiction: Government of Japan
- Headquarters: Tokyo, Japan
- Agency executive: Director-General, TAKUBO Yukinori
- Parent agency: Independent administrative institution
- Website: www.ninjal.ac.jp

The National Institute for Japanese Language and Linguistics (国立国語研究所, Kokuritsu Kokugo Kenkyūsho; NINJAL) is an independent administrative institution in Japan, established for the purpose of studying, surveying, promoting, and making recommendations for the proper usage of the Japanese language.

The institute is located in Tachikawa City in Tokyo, Japan.

== See also ==
- List of Independent Administrative Institutions (Japan)
