= Geological Survey of Japan =

Geological research institute in Japan

Coordinates: 36.06348°N 140.137062°E

Geological Survey of Japan 地質調査総合センター
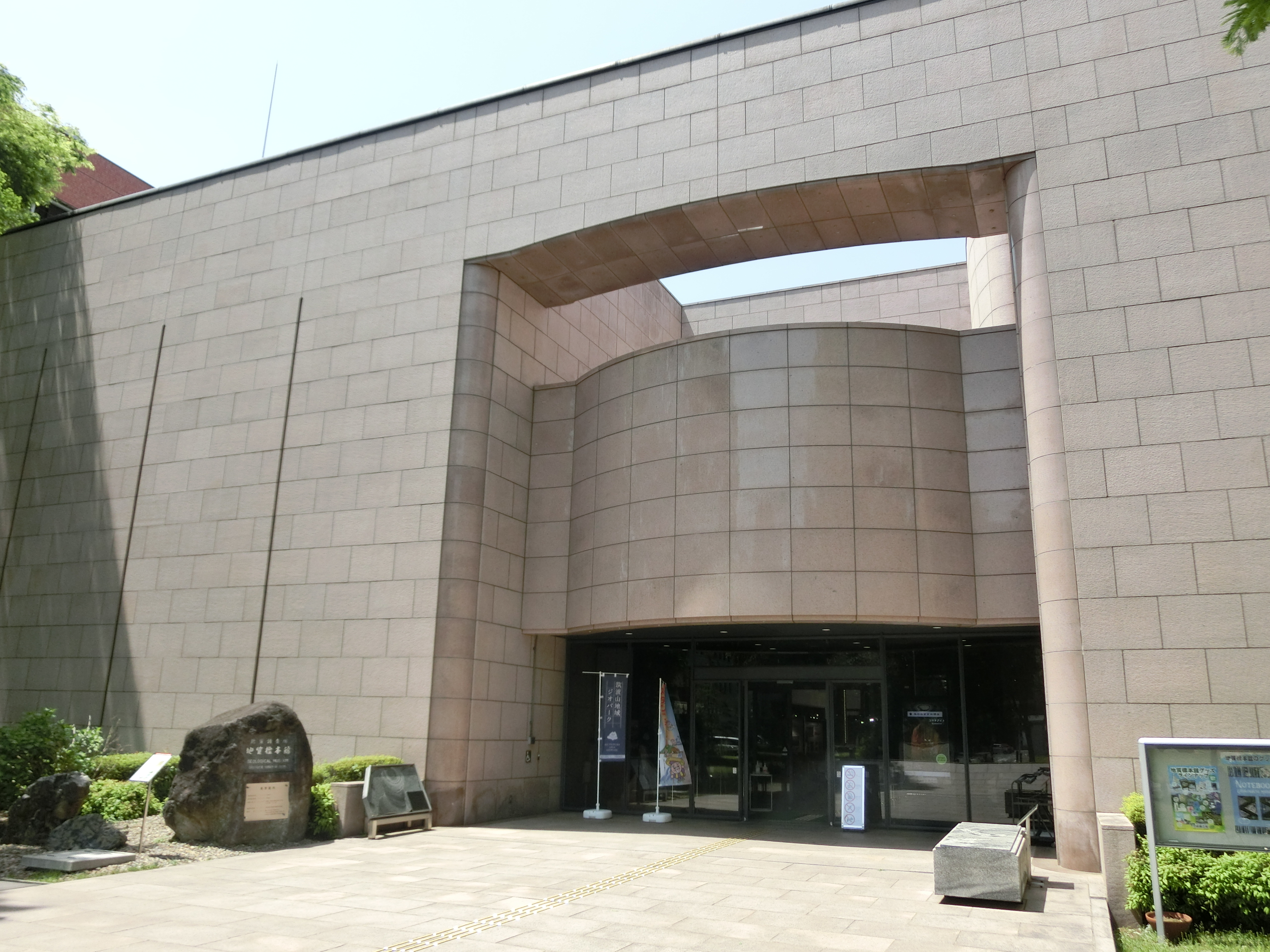
- The Survey's Geological Museum in Tsukuba

Research Institute overview
- Formed: 1882
- Headquarters: 1-1-1 Umezono, Tsukuba, Ibaraki Prefecture, Japan
- Parent department: National Institute of Advanced Industrial Science and Technology, Ministry of Economy, Trade and Industry
- Website: gsj.jp/Muse/en/index.html

The Geological Survey of Japan (地質調査総合センター, Chishitsu chōsa sōkō sentā) (GSJ) is a research institute and department of the National Institute of Advanced Industrial Science and Technology (AIST), an Independent Administrative Institution under the Ministry of Economy, Trade and Industry (METI). The Survey was initially formed in 1882 under the Ministry of Agriculture and Commerce. The Geological Survey of Japan conducts surveys of and publishes research into the geology of Japan, produces geological maps of Japan, and operates the Geological Museum.

== Publications ==
- Bulletin of the Geological Survey of Japan (地質調査研究報告) (1950–; vols. 1–)
- Chishitsu News (地質ニュース) (1953–2011; nos. 1–679)
- GSJ Chishitsu News (GSJ 地質ニュース) (2012–; vols. 1–)

== See also ==
- List of Independent Administrative Institutions (Japan)
- Heinrich Edmund Naumann
