= Nier =

Nier or NIER may refer to:

== Arts and entertainment ==
- Drakengard and Nier, a connected franchise of action role-playing games
  - Nier (video game), 2010 action role-playing video game
    - The protagonist of Nier, sometimes eponymously referred to as "Nier" by fans and series director Yoko Taro
  - Nier: Automata, the 2017 sequel to Nier
  - Nier Reincarnation, a 2021 Nier mainline game for mobile devices
- A god in the Arcanis, Dungeons & Dragons setting

== Locations ==
- Nier (Martian crater), a crater on Mars
- Nier, Alberta, a community in Rocky View

== Organizations and brands ==
- National Institute Economic Review, a British economics journal
- National Institute for Educational Policy Research (NIER), a Japanese national research institute for education sitting within MEXT
- National Institute of Environmental Research, a national research center in South Korea

== Other uses ==
- Alfred O. C. Nier (1911–1994), American physicist
  - The Nier Prize in meteoritics, named after him

== See also ==
- Niers
