= NBRC =

NBRC may refer to:

- National Board for Respiratory Care, a United States non-profit organization
- NITE Biological Resource Center, a Japanese microbiological repository
