= National Institute for Educational Research =

National Institute for Educational Research may refer to:

- China National Institute for Educational Research
- Institut national de recherche pédagogique (France)
- National Institute for Educational Policy Research (Japan), previously known as National Institute for Educational Research
