= List of Independent Administrative Institutes in Japan =

List of Incorporated Administrative Agencies in Japan identifies a number of semi-official entities which operate independently from its bureaucracy. Each of the following were created pursuant the Act on General Rules for Incorporated Administrative Agencies (Law No. 103 of 1999, modified in 2014).

== Select list ==
- The Open University of Japan.
- Electronic Navigation Research Institute.
- Forest Tree Breeding Center.
- Japan Aerospace Exploration Agency (JAXA), 2003.
- Japan Agency for Marine-Earth Science and Technology.
- Japan Atomic Energy Agency (JAEA), 2005.
- Japan Bank for International Cooperation (JBIC).
- Japan External Trade Organization (JETRO).
- Japan Housing Finance Agency.
- Japan International Cooperation Agency (JICA).
- Japan International Research Center for Agricultural Sciences.
- Japan Oil, Gas and Metals National Corporation (JOGMEC), 2004.
- Japan Science and Technology Agency (JST).
- Japan Society for the Promotion of Science (JSPS), 2003.
- Japan Sport Council.
- Labor Management Organization for USFJ Employees.
- National Institute of Information and Communications Technology (NICT). 2004.
- National Institute for Agro-Environmental Sciences.
- National Research Institute for Earth Science and Disaster Prevention.
- National Institute of Radiological Sciences.
- National Institute for Environmental Studies.
- Building Research Institute.
- Forestry and Forest Products Research Institute.
- National Institute of Health and Nutrition.
- National Center for University Entrance Examinations.
- National Institute of Occupational Safety and Health.
- National Institute of Advanced Industrial Science and Technology (AIST), 2001.
  - formerly Agency of Industrial Science and Technology (former AIST) in the Ministry of International Trade and Industry (MITI), which encompassed the following:

1. Hokkaido National Industrial Research Institute.
2. Tohoku National Industrial Research Institute.
3. National Institute for Advanced Interdisciplinary Research.
4. National Research Laboratory of Metrology.
5. Mechanical Engineering Laboratory.
6. National Institute of Materials and Chemical Research.
7. National Institute of Bioscience and Human-Technology.
8. Electrotechnical Laboratory.
9. Geological Survey of Japan.
10. National Institute for Resources and Environment.
11. National Industrial Research Institute of Nagoya.
12. Osaka National Research Institute.
13. Chugoku National Industrial Research Institute.
14. Shikoku National Industrial Research Institute.
15. Kyushu National Industrial Research Institute.
16. MITI Weights and Measures Training Institute.

- National Institution for Academic Degrees and University Evaluation (NIAD-UE), 2004.
- Center for National University Finance and Management.
- National Institute for Materials Science. (NIMS)
- National Institute of Agrobiological Sciences.
- National Maritime Research Institute.
- Port and Airport Research Institute.
- National Research Institute of Brewing (NRIB).
- National Traffic Safety and Environment Laboratory.
- National Women's Education Center of Japan (NWEC).
- National Museum of Nature and Science.
- National Institute for Japanese Language and Linguistics.
- National Institutes for Cultural Heritage, Tokyo National Museum (TNM), 2007.
  - formerly Tokyo National Museum of the Independent Administrative Institution National Museum, 2001.
- National Institutes for Cultural Heritage, Kyoto National Museum, (KNM) 2007.
  - formerly Kyoto National Museum of the Independent Administrative Institution National Museum, 2001.
- National Institutes for Cultural Heritage, Nara National Museum (NNM), 2007.
  - formerly Nara National Museum of the Independent Administrative Institution National Museum, 2001.
- National Institutes for Cultural Heritage, Kyushu National Museum, 2007.
  - formerly Kyushu National Museum of the Independent Administrative Institution National Museum, 2005.
- National Research Institute for Cultural Heritage, Tokyo, 2007.
  - formerly National Research Institute for Cultural Properties, Tokyo, 2001.
- National Research Institute for Cultural Heritage, Nara, 2001.
  - formerly National Research Institute for Cultural Properties, Nara, 2001.
- National Museum of Art, Tokyo National Museum of Modern Art, Tokyo (MOMAT), 2001.
  - Tokyo National Museum of Modern Art, 2001.
  - National Film Center (NFC), 2001.
- National Museum of Art, Tokyo National Museum of Western Art (NMWA), 2001.
- National Museum of Art, Tokyo National Museum of Modern Art, Kyoto.
- National Museum of Art, Tokyo National Museum of Art, Osaka.
- National Institute of Special Needs Education.
- Fisheries Research Agency.
- Public Works Research Institute.
- National Agriculture and Food Research Organization.
- National Agency for the Advancement of Sports and Health Japan Institute of Sports Sciences.
- National Archives of Japan.
- Research Institute of Economy, Trade and Industry (RIETI).
- RIKEN (The Institute of Physical and Chemical Research).
- Urban Renaissance Agency.
- Pharmaceuticals and Medical Devices Agency.

== See also ==
- Independent Administrative Institution
- List of National Laboratories (Japan)
- Independent Administrative Institution National Institutes for Cultural Heritage, 2007.
  - formerly Independent Administrative Institution National Museum, 2001.
  - formerly Independent Administrative Institution National Research Institute for Cultural Properties, 2001.
- Japan Mint
- Japan National Tourism Organization
