= List of National Laboratories (Japan) =

List of National Laboratories (Japan) are scientific research centers in Japan which are encompassed within the community served by the Japan Society for the Promotion of Science (JSPS).

- National Institute of Health and Nutrition.
- National Institute for Land and Infrastructure Management.
- National Research Institute of Police Science, Japan.
- National Institute of Public Health.
- National Center for Child Health and Development.
- National Institute of Science and Technology Policy.
- Policy Research Institute, Ministry of Agriculture, Forestry and Fisheries (Japan)
- National Institute for Minamata Disease.
- National Research Institute of Fire and Disaster.
- National Institute for Longevity Sciences (NCGG).
- Meteorological Research Institute, JMA.
- National Cancer Center.
- National Center of Neurology and Psychiatry (NCNP).
- National Institute of Infectious Diseases
- National Cardiovascular Center.
- Research Institute, National Rehabilitation Center for Persons with Disabilities.
- International Medical Center of Japan.
- National Institute of Health Sciences.
- Geographical Survey Institute of Japan (Geography & Crustal Dynamics Research Center).
- National Institute of Population and Social Security Research.
- Hydrographic and Oceanographic Department.
- National Institute for Educational Policy Research.

== See also ==
- List of Independent Administrative Institutions (Japan)
