= Geological Museum (Japan) =

Museum in Japan

- 地質標本館
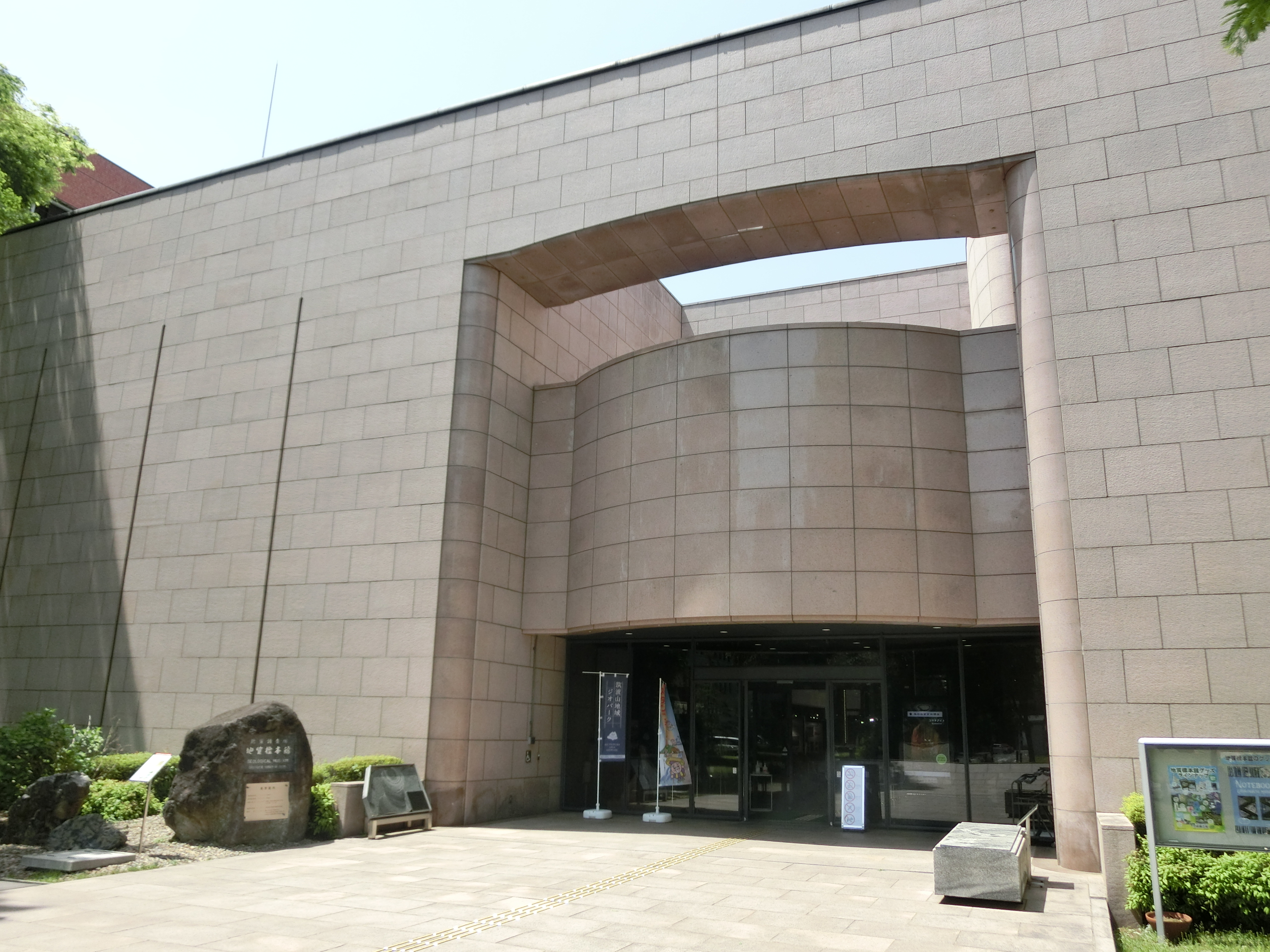

General information
- Location: 1-1-1, Higashi, Tsukuba, Ibaraki Prefecture, Japan
- Coordinates: 36°03′43″N 140°07′58″E
- Opened: 1980

Website
- Official website

The Geological Museum (地質標本館, Chishitsu Hyōhon-kan) of the Geological Survey of Japan opened in Tsukuba, Ibaraki Prefecture, Japan in 1980. The collection totals some 150,000 rock, mineral, and fossil specimens, amassed during the activities of the Survey since its establishment in 1882, of which around 2,000 are on display at any one time.

== See also ==
- Ibaraki Prefectural Museum of History
