= Japan Organization for Metals and Energy Security =

Japanese government Independent Administrative Institution

Coordinates: 35.667585°N 139.745064°E

- 独立行政法人エネルギー・金属鉱物資源機構

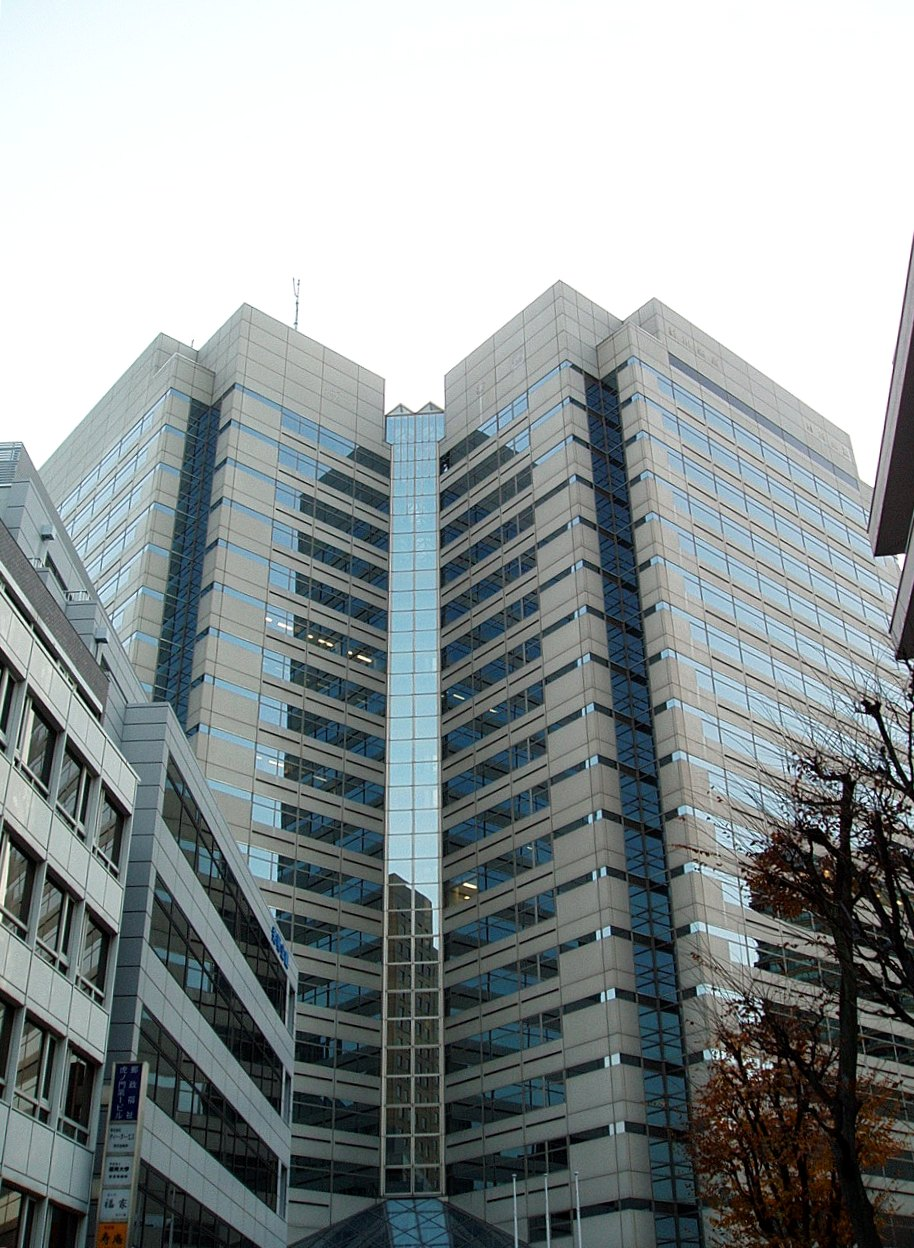
- The headquarters in Toranomon Twin Building, Tokyo

Agency overview
- Formed: 29 March 2004; 22 years ago
- Preceding agency: Japan National Oil Corporation (JNOC), Metal Mining Agency of Japan (MMAJ)
- Jurisdiction: Japan, Agency for Natural Resources and Energy
- Headquarters: Minato-ku, Tokyo, Japan
- Employees: 604 people (January 1, 2019)
- Annual budget: 1,839 Billion Yen (2014 Fiscal Year)
- Agency executive: President, Tetsuhiro Hosono
- Child agency: 13 Overseas offices
- Website: http://www.jogmec.go.jp/

The Japan Organization for Metals and Energy Security (独立行政法人エネルギー・金属鉱物資源機構, Enerugī kinzoku kōbutsu shigen kikō; JOGMEC), is a Japanese government Independent Administrative Institution which was created in 2004 when the former Japan National Oil Corporation merged with the former Metal Mining Agency of Japan.

== History ==
JOGMEC integrates corollary functions in one administrative entity. The former Japan National Oil Corporation (JNOC) had been tasked with securing a stable supply of oil and natural gas for Japan's use. The former Metal Mining Agency of Japan (MMAJ) had been tasked with ensuring a stable supply of nonferrous metal and mineral resources for Japan's use. Greater efficiencies were realized by combining two bureaucracies with similar missions. JOGMEC was established in 2004 pursuant to the 2002 Law Concerning the Japan Oil, Gas and Metals National Corporation.

In March 2013, JOGMEC becomes the first to successfully extract methane hydrate from seabed deposits.

== Activities ==
JOGMEC's Geological Remote Satellite Sensing Centre in Lobatse, Botswana was created in partnership with the southern African nation's Department of Geological Survey in July 2008. The Japan-Botswana partnership will work together in developing the exploration of minerals through methods such as remote sensing.

JOGMEC carried out the world's first "large-scale" deep sea mining of hydrothermal vent mineral deposits in August – September, 2017. This mining was carried out at the 'Izena hole/cauldron' vent field within the hydrothermally active back-arc basin known as the Okinawa Trough which contains 15 confirmed vent fields according to the InterRidge Vents Database.

JOGMEC manages rare metal stockpiles in conjunction with private companies.

== See also ==
- Critical mineral raw materials
- Energy in Japan
- Energy law
- List of Independent Administrative Institutions (Japan)
