= National Agriculture and Food Research Organization =

Japanese agricultural and food research organization

National Agriculture and Food Research Organization (NARO)
- Former names: National Agriculture and Bio-oriented Research Organization
- Established: 2006
- President: Kazuo Kyuma 久間和生 (Kyūma Kazuo)
- Administrative staff: 4900 (as of 2009)
- Location: multiple locations, Japan; 36.0143°N 140.0609°E
- Campus: Tsukuba, Tsu, Sapporo, Morioka, Fukuyama, Kōshi, Saitama
- Website: www.naro.affrc.go.jp
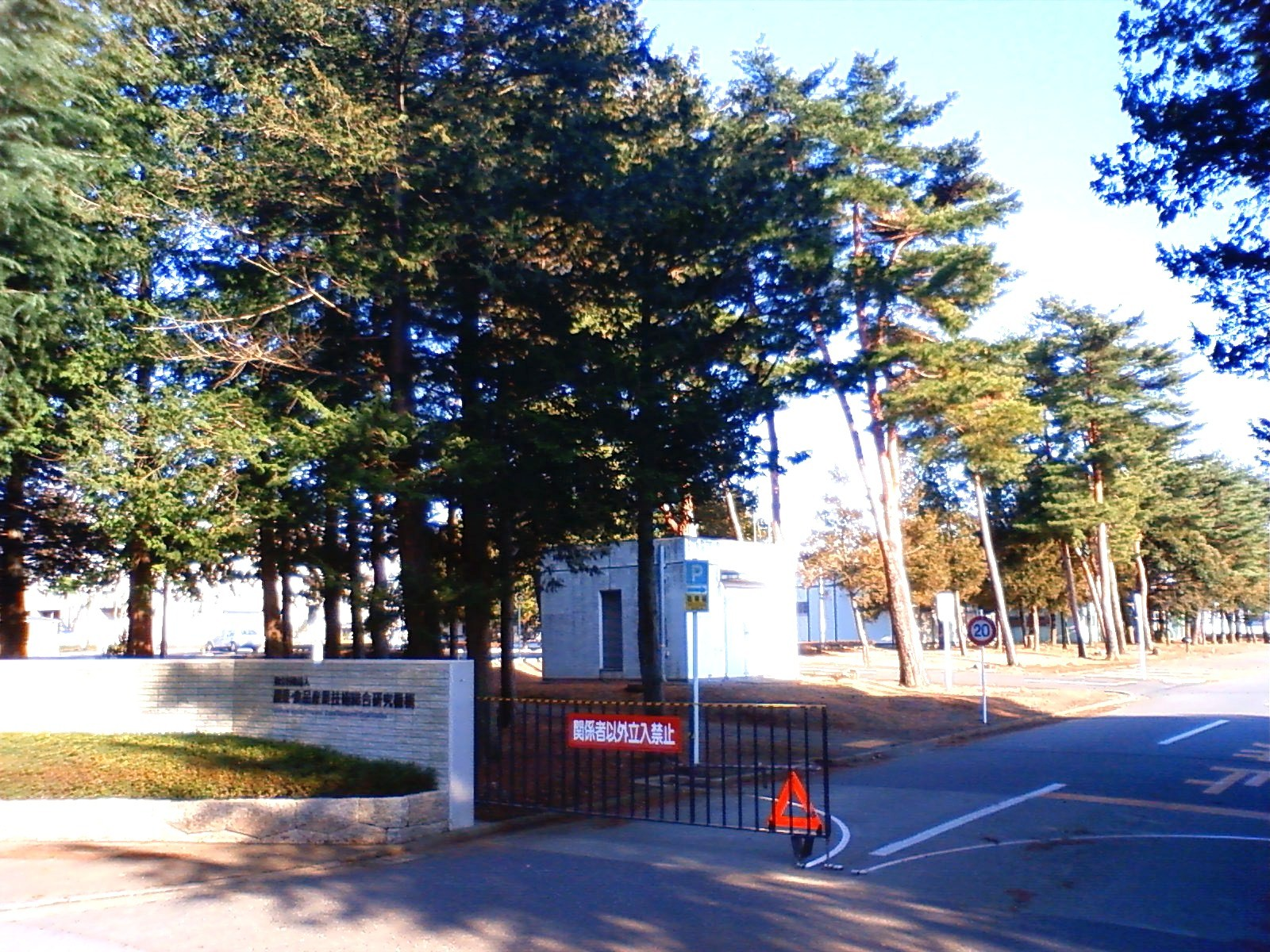

The National Agriculture and Food Research Organization (農業・食品産業技術総合研究機構, Nōgyō Shokuhin Sangyō Gijutsu Sōgō Kenkyū Kikō; NARO) is a Japanese research facility headquartered in Tsukuba Science City, Ibaraki, and the workforce is located in Tsukuba and in several cities and towns throughout Japan. The organization is dedicated to scientific research related to Agriculture. It became a new legal body of Independent Administrative Institution in 2001 originally as National Agricultural Research Organization, remaining under the Ministry of Agriculture, Forestry and Fisheries (MAFF).

== History ==
In 2001, the National Agricultural Research Organization was established based on research institutes and experimental stations of MAFF. It was merged with a research institution in 2003 and with two other research institutes in 2006, and then renamed to the present name, National Agriculture and Food Research Organization. Many of the research institutes and research centers constituting NARO have a history of more than 100 years.

== Organization ==
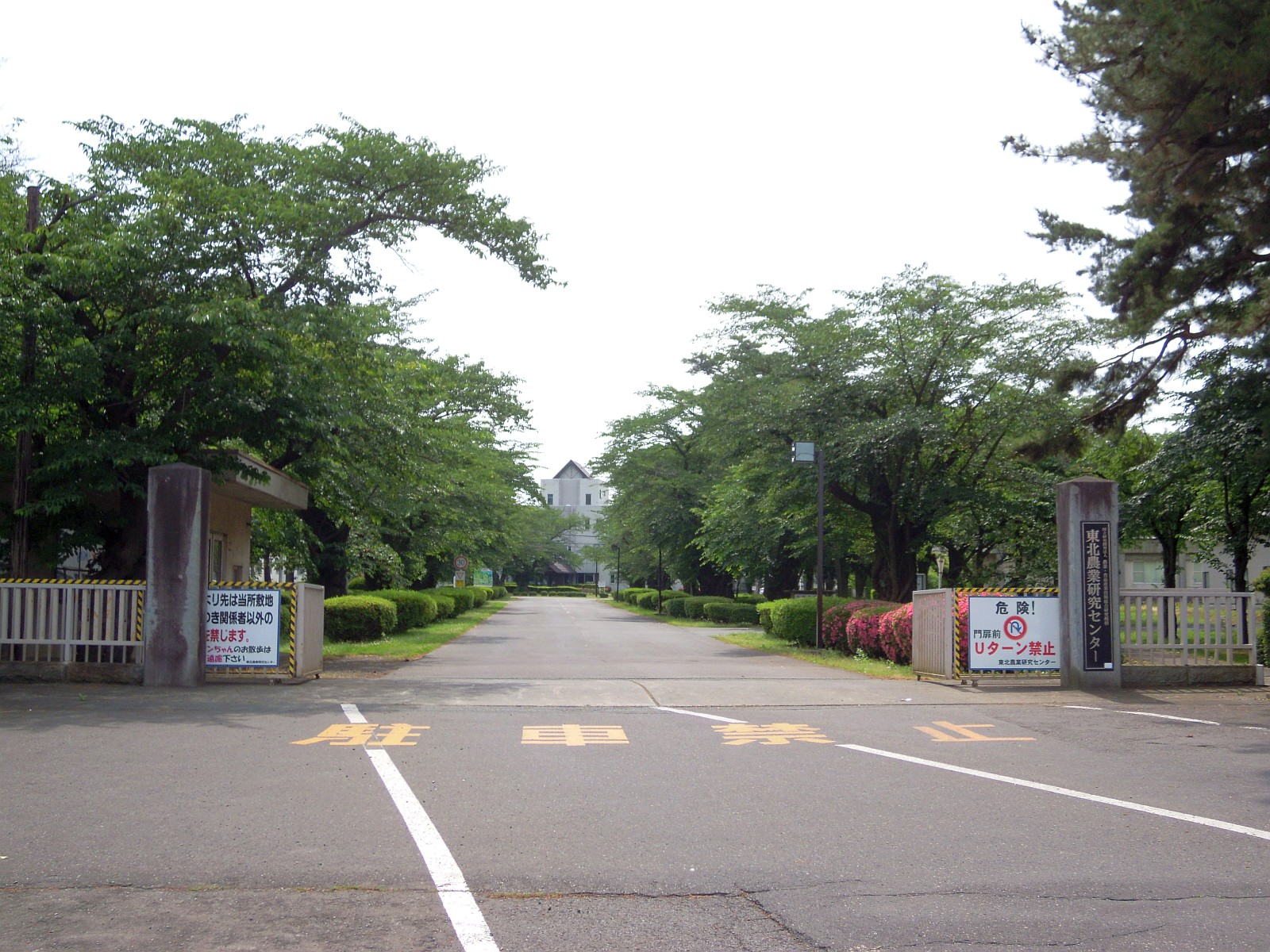
NARO Tohoku Agricultural Research Center

- Headquarters (Tsukuba)
- NARO Agricultural Research Center (NARO/ARC) (Tsukuba)
- NARO Institute of Crop Science (NICS) (Tsukuba)
- NARO Institute of Fruit Tree Science (NIFTS) (Tsukuba)
- NARO Institute of Floricultural Science (NIFS) (Tsukuba)
- NARO Institute of Vegetable and Tea Science (NIVTS) (Tsu)
- NARO Institute of Livestock and Grassland Science (NILGS) (Tsukuba)
- National Institute of Animal Health (NIAH) (Tsukuba)
- National Institute for Rural Engineering (NIRE) (Tsukuba)
- National Food Research Institute (NFRI) (Tsukuba)
- NARO Hokkaido Agricultural Research Center (NARO/HARC) (Sapporo)
- NARO Tohoku Agricultural Research Center (NARO/TARC) (Morioka)
- NARO Western Region Agricultural Research Center (NARO/WARC) (Fukuyama)
- NARO Kyushu Okinawa Agricultural Research Center (NARO/KARC) (Kōshi)
- NARO Bio-oriented Technology Research Advancement Institution (BRAIN) (Saitama)

== Employees ==
The number of employees are as follows:

- Researchers: 1,542
- Administrative staffs: 598
- Technical staffs: 528
- Total number of employees: 2,677 (as of April 1, 2013)

(Part-time staffs are not included.)

== See also ==
- List of Independent Administrative Institutions (Japan)
