= National Institute of Technology and Evaluation =

Japanese institution

- Former names: National Institute of Technology and Evaluation
- Established: 2001
- President: Takashi Tatsumi
- Administrative staff: 400
- Location: Multiple locations, Japan
- Website: www.nite.go.jp

The National Institute of Technology and Evaluation (製品評価技術基盤機構, Seihin Hyōka Gijutsu Kiban Kikō), or NITE is an Independent Administrative Institution, established by the Japanese government, aiming to contribute to the "safety and security of life" supported by reliable technology and information.

== History ==
The predecessors of NITE were five Inspection Institutes of the Japanese government, such as the Export Silk Fabrics Inspection Institute established in 1928, Machinery and Tools Inspection Institute in 1948. After several reorganization steps, they were integrated into the International Trade and Industry Inspection Institute in 1984. It was reorganized into the National Institute of Technology and Evaluation in 1995 and established as an incorporated administrative agency in 2001 remaining under the Ministry of Economy, Trade and Industry.

== Missions ==
- To establish intellectual foundations for the development of the economy as well as for the safety and security of society.

NITE works toward the mission by technical evaluation of industrial products, and preservation and distribution of products’ information, in the following four fields.

1. Biotechnology field

The Department of Biotechnology (DOB) manages NITE Biological Resource Center (NBRC), which works as a national culture collection in Japan. It is dedicated to the acquisition, characterization, identification, and preservation of microorganisms, such as bacteria, archaea, fungi and microalgae, and distribution of those microbes together with their genetic information to the universities, research institutions and industries. It also manages a patent depositary for biological material under the Budapest Treaty. Based on the principles of the Convention on Biological Diversity (CBD), DOB has been conducting collaborative research with a number of Asian countries in conservation and sustainable use of microbial resources. It also works for biosafety following by the guidelines of Cartagena Protocol.

2. Chemical management field

The Chemical Management Center of NITE undertakes a central role in the comprehensive chemical management. The three main aspects of the center's activities are 1) Support for the enforcement of laws and regulations related to the risk management of chemical substances, 2) Arrangement and provision of comprehensive information, by developing databases, to provide knowledge required for implementing chemical management system, 3) Development and management of risk assessment of chemical substances.

3. Accreditation field

The International Accreditation Japan (IAJapan) is an accreditation body that was established following a comprehensive review of accreditation programs for testing and calibration laboratories operated at NITE. The establishment of IAJapan is based on the perception that it is the duty of the government accreditation body to respond to requests from industries, academies, and the government administrations. Accreditation programs currently operated in IAJapan include MLAP (Specified Measurement Laboratory Accreditation Program), JCSS (Japan Calibration Service System), JNLA (Japan National Laboratory Accreditation System) and ASNITE (Accreditation System of NITE).

4. Consumer products safety field

The Products Safety Technology Center of NITE collects accidents information on consumer products, investigates their causes and makes the results available to the public. It also conducts product tests to identify the safety and quality performances, and on-site inspections to confirm businesses’ compliance with the laws and regulations on product safety. The results are periodically stored in an accident information database, which is made available to the public on the website. The Center also contributes to the development of standards in the area related to the consumer safety, in collaboration with universities and research institutes.
