= National Museum of Western Art =

Art museum in Tokyo, Japan

UNESCO World Heritage Site
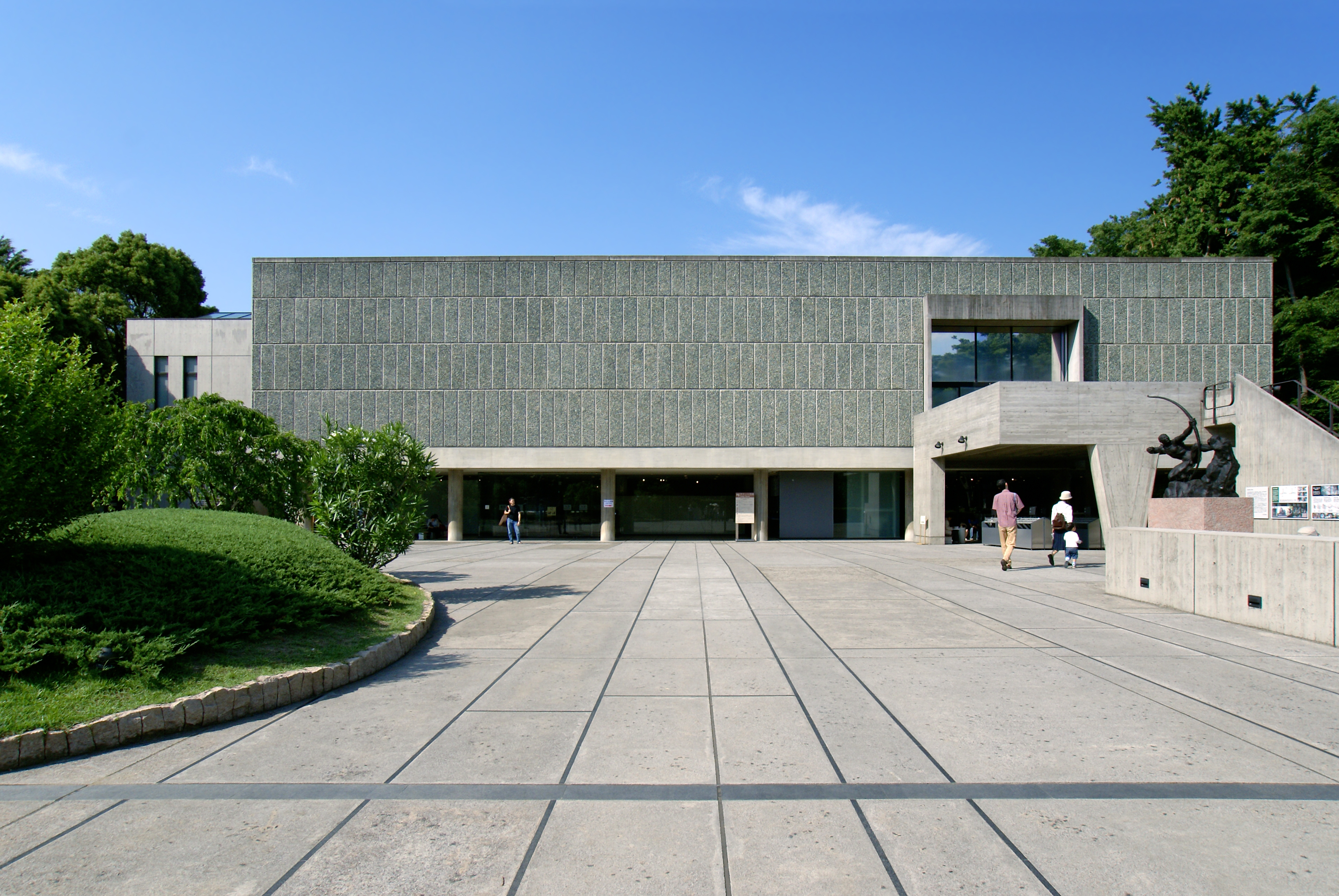
- Logo, designed by Shin Matsunaga, and National Museum of Western Art, designed by Le Corbusier
- Interactive map of National Museum of Western Art
- Official name: Musée National des Beaux-Arts de l’Occident
- Location: 7-7 Ueno Imperial Grant Park, Taitō, Tokyo, Japan
- Part of: The Architectural Work of Le Corbusier, an Outstanding Contribution to the Modern Movement
- Criteria: Cultural: (i), (ii), (vi)
- Reference: 1321rev-016
- Inscription: 2016 (40th Session)
- Area: 0.93 ha (0.0036 sq mi)
- Buffer zone: 116.17 ha (0.4485 sq mi)
- Website: www.nmwa.go.jp/en/

The National Museum of Western Art (国立西洋美術館, Kokuritsu Seiyō Bijutsukan; lit. "National Western Art Museum", NMWA) is the premier public art gallery in Japan specializing in art from the Western tradition. The museum is in the Ueno Park in Taitō, central Tokyo. It received 1,162,345 visitors in 2016.

== History ==
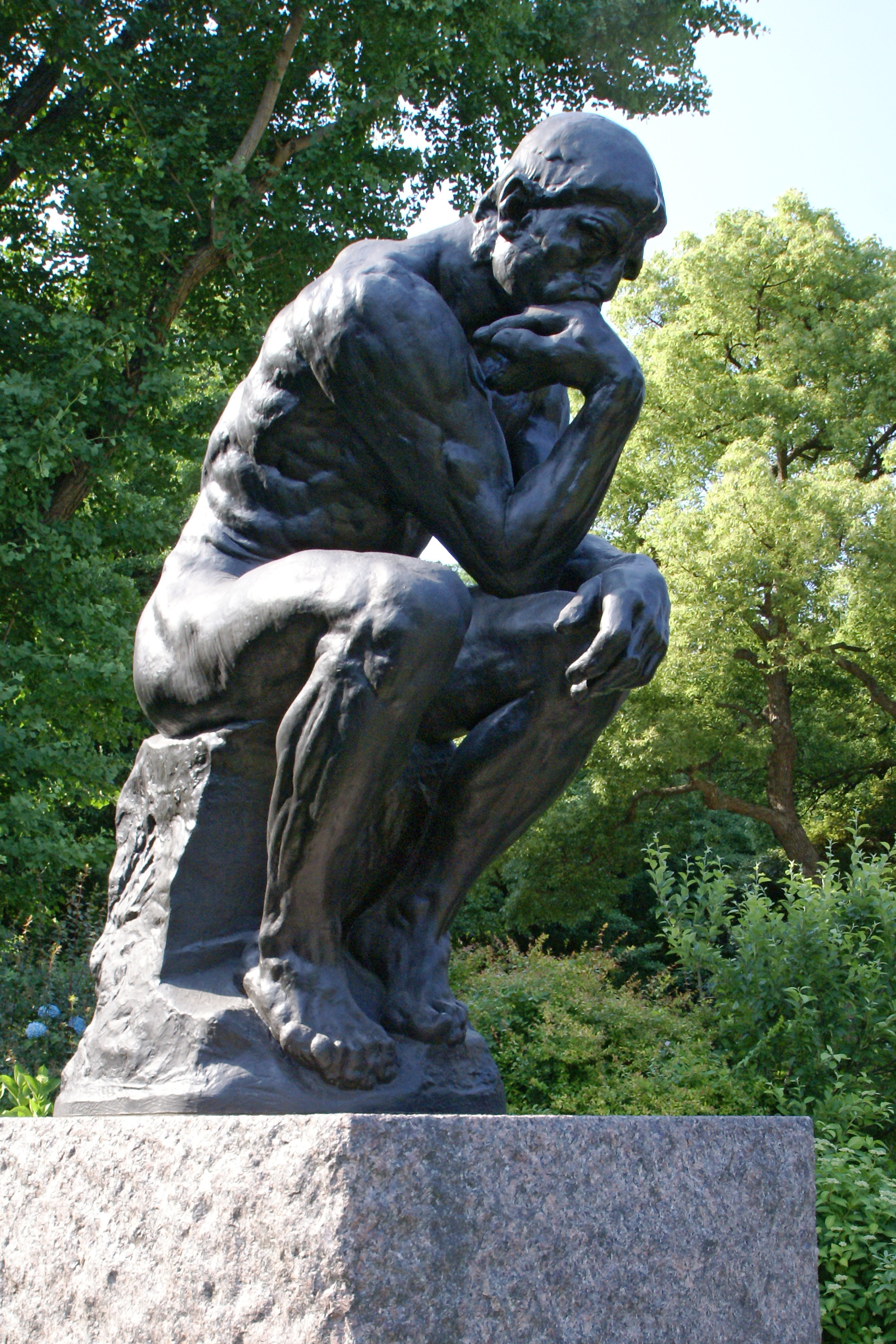
Auguste Rodin's The Thinker near the entrance of the National Museum of Western Art.

The NMWA was established on June 10, 1959. The museum developed around the core art collection of Kōjirō Matsukata (1865–1950), whose thinking is mirrored in the museum he anticipated.

Matsukata's acquisition strategies were designed to create the nucleus of what he hoped would become an evolving national museum specializing in Western art.

The museum exhibits works from the Renaissance to the early 20th century, many having been acquired since the museum's opening. The museum's purpose is to provide the public with opportunities to appreciate Western art.

Since its opening, the museum, as Japan's only national institution devoted to Western art, has been involved in exhibitions, art work and document acquisition, research, restoration and conservation, education and the publication of materials related to Western art.

== Exhibitions ==
The museum is involved in the development and organization of a special exhibition every year. These exhibitions feature works on loan from private collections and museums both in and out of Japan. In 1963, NMWA created a splash on the international art scene by bringing together 450 works by Marc Chagall. The exhibition brought together Chagall's work from 15 countries, including 8 paintings lent from the Soviet Union; and it was believed to be the most comprehensive show mounted during the artist's lifetime.

In January 2019, it was announced that the National Gallery, London will loan over 60 paintings for a two-venue tour of the National Museum of Western Art, Tokyo and the National Museum of Art, Osaka in 2020, the year of the Tokyo Olympics. Included within the loaned collection will be Vincent van Gogh's Sunflowers, which will travel to Japan for the first time.

== Collections ==
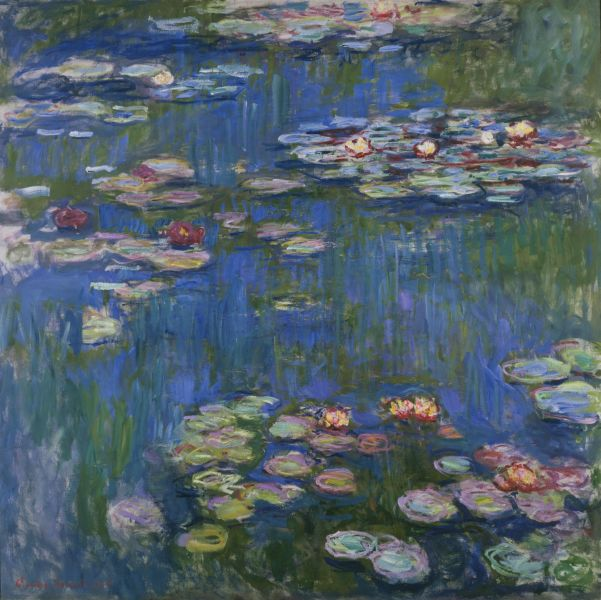
Claude Monet, Water Lilies, 1916, oil on canvas, 200.5 × 201 cm (78.9 × 79.1 in)

NMWA has purchased art work every year since its establishment in its efforts to build and develop its permanent collection. The museum houses about 4,500 works, including examples of painting and sculpture from the 14th through the beginning of the 20th century. The museum's holdings have expanded in the decades since the museum was first opened to the public:

=== Paintings; 18th century and earlier ===
The Main Building displays pre-18th-century paintings, including those by Veronese, Rubens, Brueghel, and Fragonard. Many of these paintings are religious paintings featuring imagery from Christianity.

=== Paintings: 19th-20th century ===
The New Wing displays 19th- to early 20th-century French paintings, including works by Delacroix, Courbet, Manet, Renoir, Monet, Van Gogh, Gauguin, and Moreau. The galleries also feature works by the next generation of artists, such as Marquet, Picasso, Soutin, Ernst, Miró, Dubuffet and Pollock.

=== Drawings ===
The NMWA drawing collection centers on works by such 18th- to 19th-century French artists as Boucher, Fragonard, Delacroix, Moreau, Rodin, and Cézanne.

=== Prints ===
The prints collection features works by Dürer, Holbein, Rembrandt, Callot, Piranesi, Goya, and Klinger, ranging from the 15th century through the early 20th century.

=== Union catalog ===
The "Union Catalog of the Collections of the National Art Museums, Japan" is a consolidated catalog of material held by the four Japanese national art museums:

- The National Museum of Modern Art, Kyoto (MOMAK).
- The National Museum of Modern Art, Tokyo (MOMAT)
- The National Museum of Art, Osaka (NMAO)
- The National Museum of Western Art (NMWA)

The online version of this union catalog is currently under construction, with only selected works available at this time.

== Le Corbusier's building ==
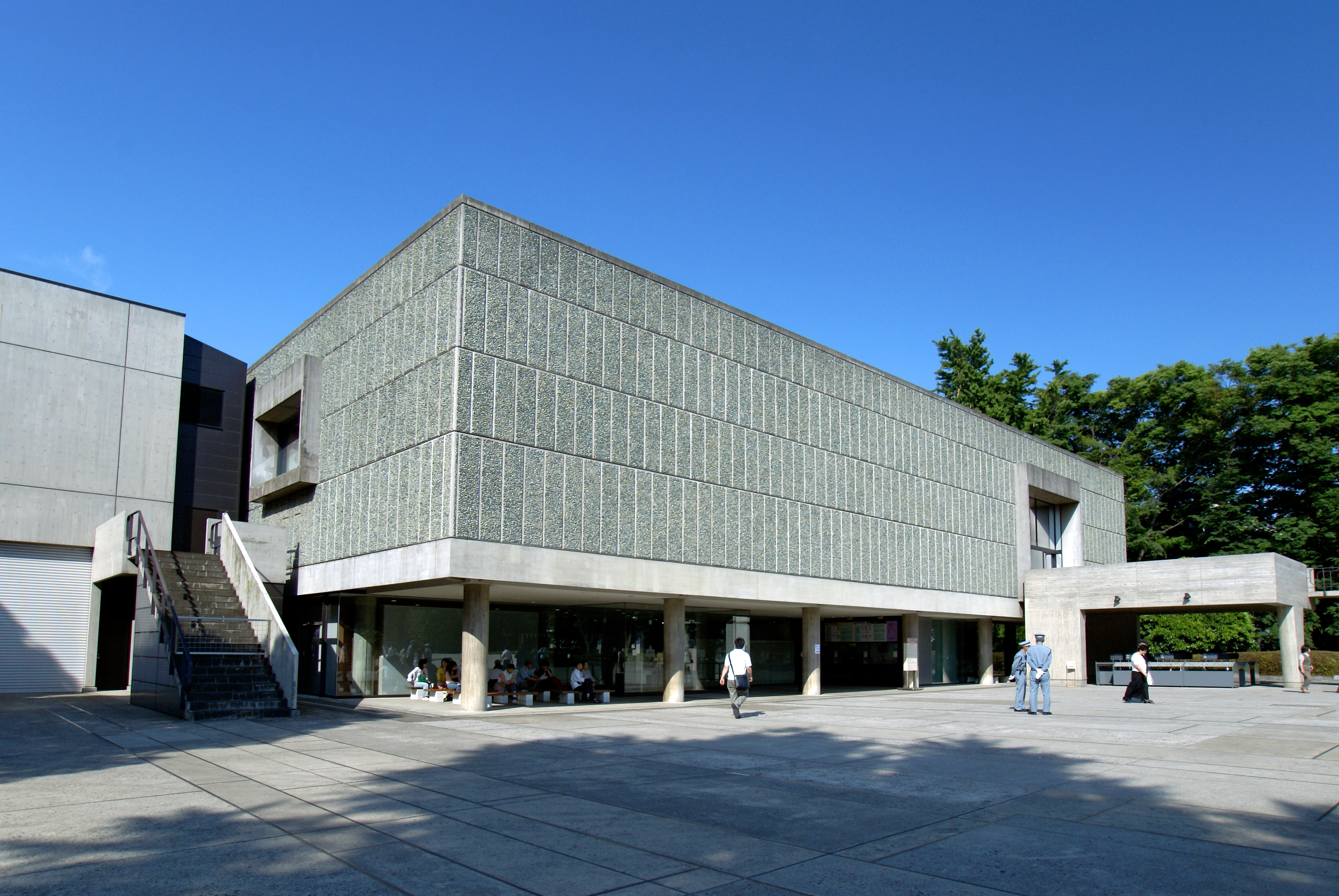
National Museum of Western Art, Tokyo. One of the examples of architecture by Le Corbusier

The Main Building was designed by the Swiss-French architect Le Corbusier. It is the only representative example of his work in the Far East; and the New York Times review of its opening suggested that the building itself presented an "artistic significance and beauty" which rivaled the paintings inside. The multi-story, reinforced concrete building was completed in March 1959 as a symbol of the resumption of diplomatic ties between Japan and France after World War II.

=== Commission ===
The museum was built to house the collection of works gathered by the industrialist Kōjirō Matsukata between 1920 and 1923. His collection remained in England and France until after World War II, when the Japanese Government asked France for its return to Japan. After France stipulated that a French architect should design the museum that would house the collection, the works were returned to Japan. Le Corbusier was selected for this task.

Le Corbusier designed a masterplan to include the area surrounding the museum. The design itself evolved into a building far exceeding the original brief and the library, a small lecture hall and a room for distinguished guests had to be removed. Nonetheless, the removed elements were retained on the plans to provide guidance for future extension.

Le Corbusier asked that his three Japanese apprentices: Kunio Maekawa, Junzo Sakakura and Takamasa Yoshizaka be responsible for developing the detailed drawings and supervising the construction.

=== Building ===
The museum is square in plan, with the main body of the galleries raised on piloti to first floor level. The layout is influenced by Le Corbusier's Sanskar Kendra museum in Ahmedabad which was being designed at the same time.

Entrance for visitors is at ground floor level via the 19th Century Hall. This double height space is lit from above with a north glazed pyramidal skylight intersected with reinforced concrete beams and a column. On the opposite side of the hall from the entrance, the ascent to the paintings gallery is via a promenade ramp, which affords better views of Rodin's sculptures. The paintings gallery wraps around 19th Century Hall, the ceiling is initially low but is raised to two storeys around the perimeter to display the paintings. There are also balconies at this level that push back into the 19th Century Hall to re-orient the visitor. Le Corbusier designed the paintings gallery to be lit by natural daylight via four lighting troughs, but these are no longer used, and the galleries are now artificially lit.

Externally, the building is clad in prefabricated concrete panels which sit on U-shaped frames supported by the inner wall. The building generally is constructed of reinforced concrete and the columns have a smooth concrete finish.

After more than two years of construction, the building opened on 10 June 1959.

==== Modulor ====
In every element of the building, Le Corbusier's Modulor has been applied:

"The modular, which Le Corbusier developed after many years of research, is like a musical scale which gives order to the infinitude of possible musical pitches. Based on the size and proportions of the human body, it is a means of fitting architecture to the human spirit, of ordering the infinitude of possible proportions in such a way as to make them conform to the human shape. In the new Museum of Western Art, the modulor system has been observed in everything from the structural members to the architectural details and furnishings."

- Tadayoshi, Fujiki, August 1959 "The Modular in the National Museum of Western Art" Japan Architect, p. 48

==== Additions ====
The museum has been expanded and modified over the years. Sakakura Associates designed a lecture hall and office building in 1964 and a ticket office in 1984. Whilst Maekawa Associates added a new annex in 1979 and in 1998 in conjunction with the Ministry of Construction, Yokoyama Engineering and Shimizu Construction installed earthquake resistant foundations to the museum.

=== Recognition ===
In 1998, the importance of the structure was underscored when it was included in the former Ministry of Construction's survey—as one of the hundred selected public buildings (the Kokyo Kenchiku 100 Sen) which are outstanding and "well established in the local community."

In 2005 the museum was recognised by Docomomo International as one of Japan's top one hundred modernist buildings.

==== World Heritage Site ====
In 2007, the building was registered by Japan on a provisional UNESCO list for World Heritage cultural site candidates as an Important Cultural Property, at the request of the French government.

In July 2016 UNESCO listed 17 works by Le Corbusier as World Heritage Sites, including the 1959 National Museum of Western Art building.

== Access ==
- Ueno Station (with JR East and Tokyo Metro)
- Uguisudani Station (with JR East)
- Keisei Ueno Station (with Keisei Electric Railway)

== Collection gallery - paintings ==
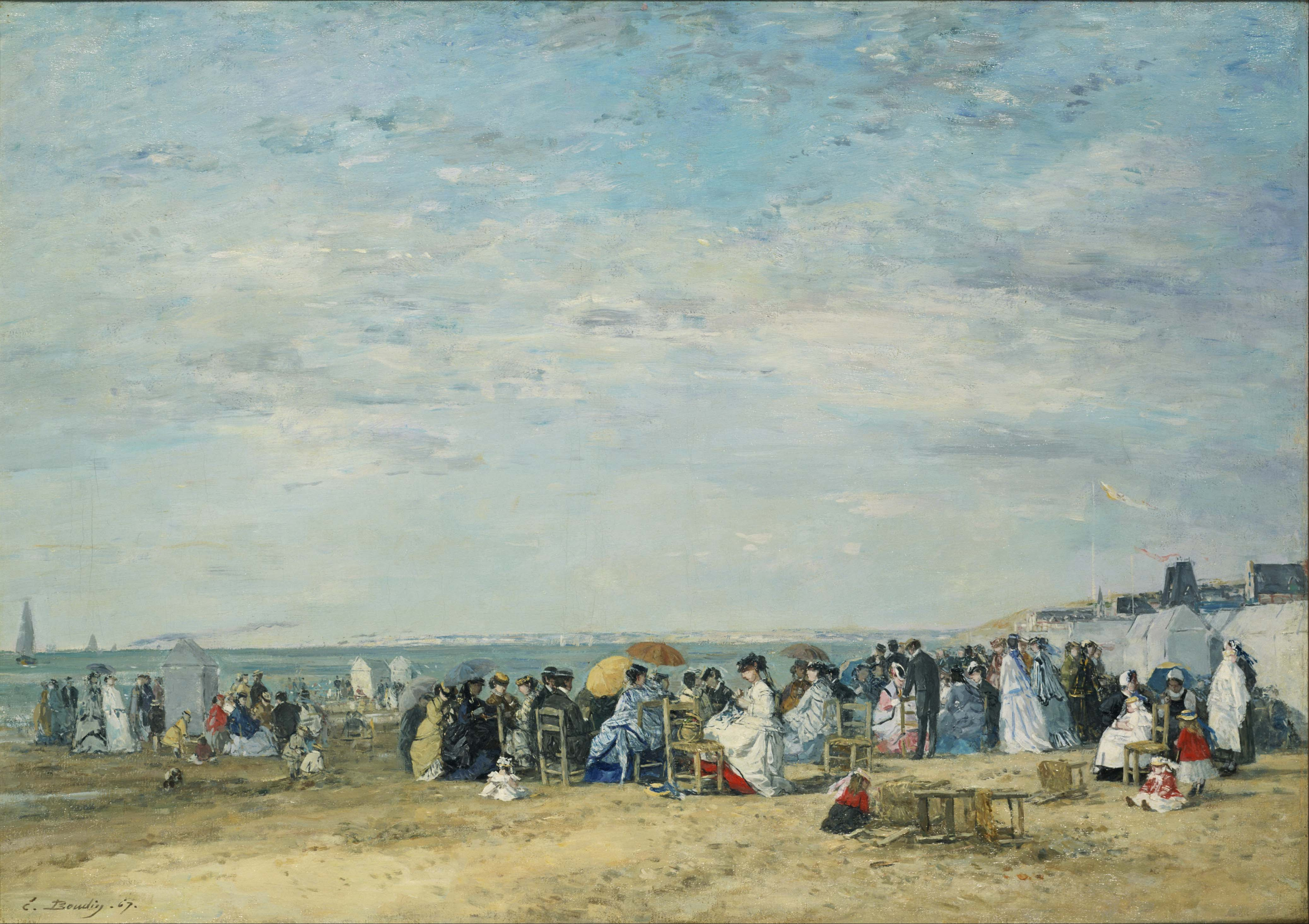
Eugène Boudin

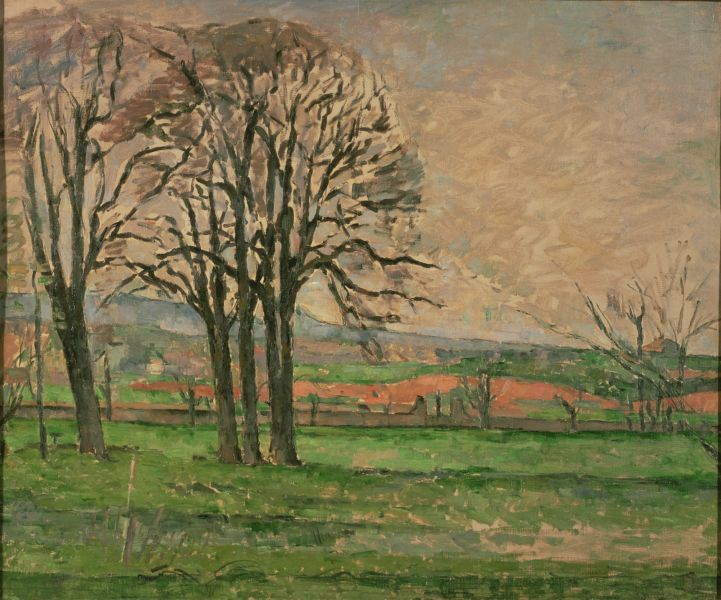
Paul Cézanne

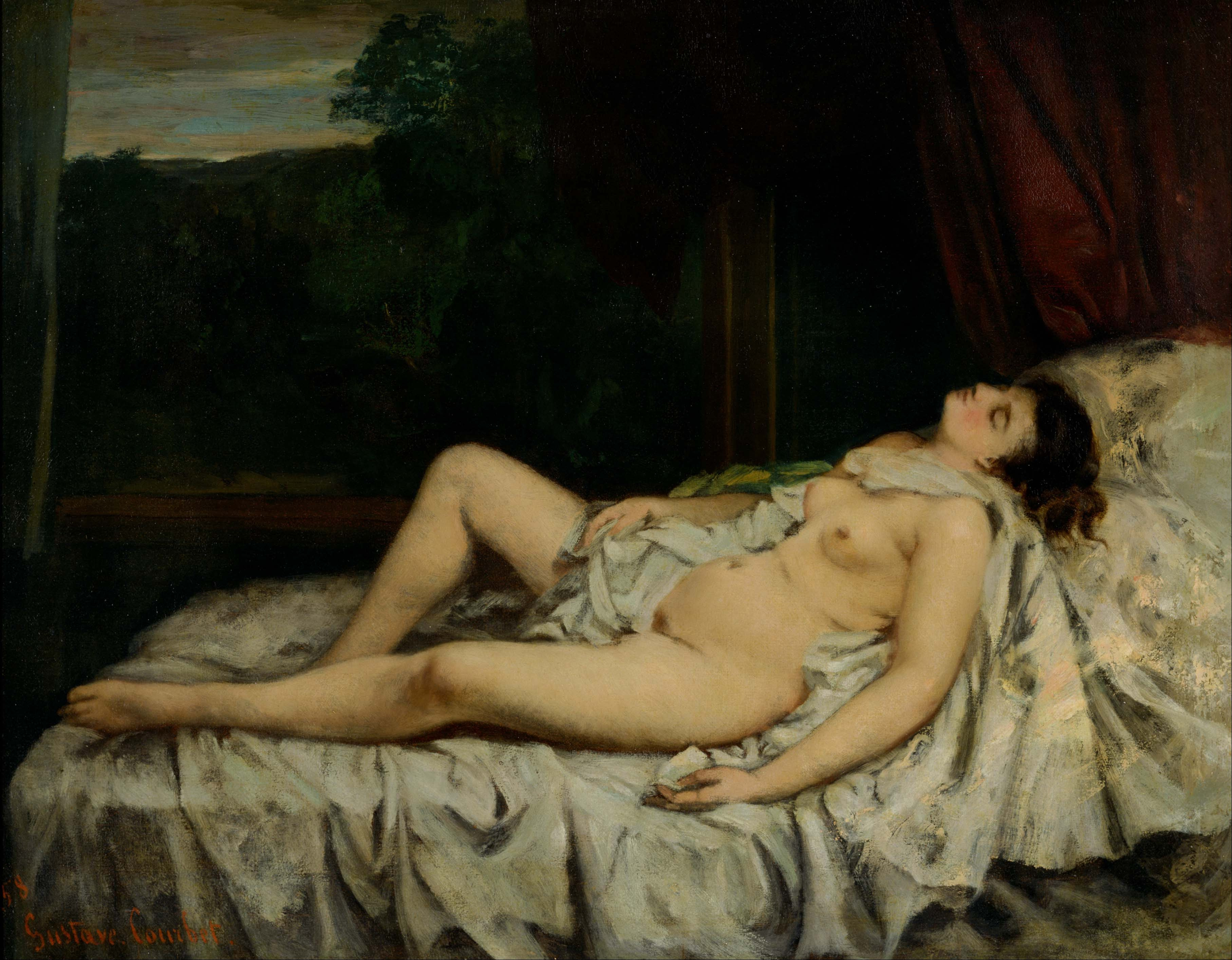
Gustave Courbet

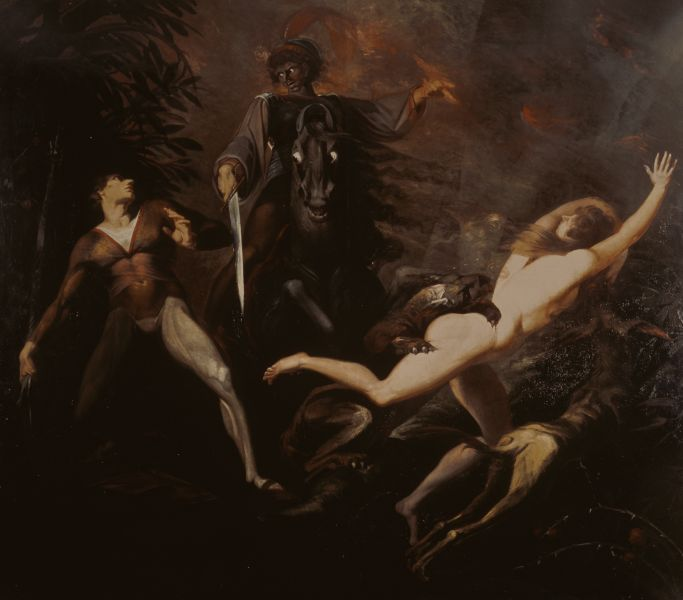
Henry Fuseli

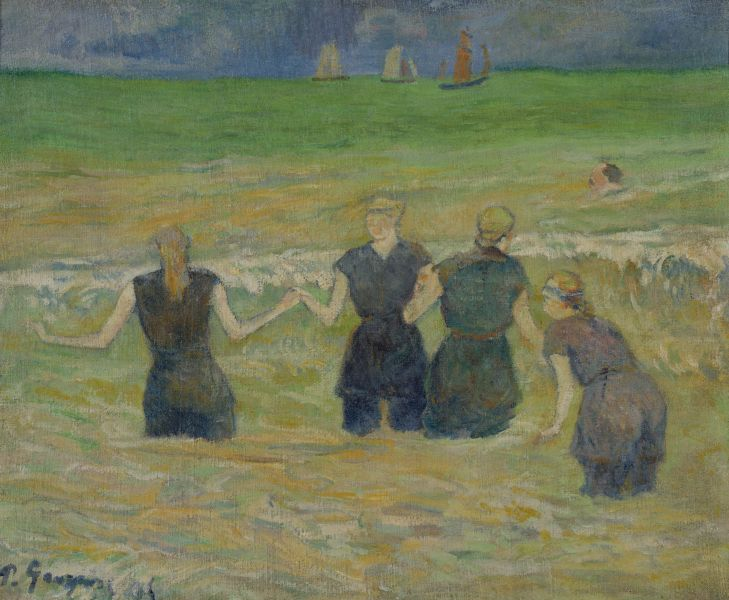
Paul Gauguin

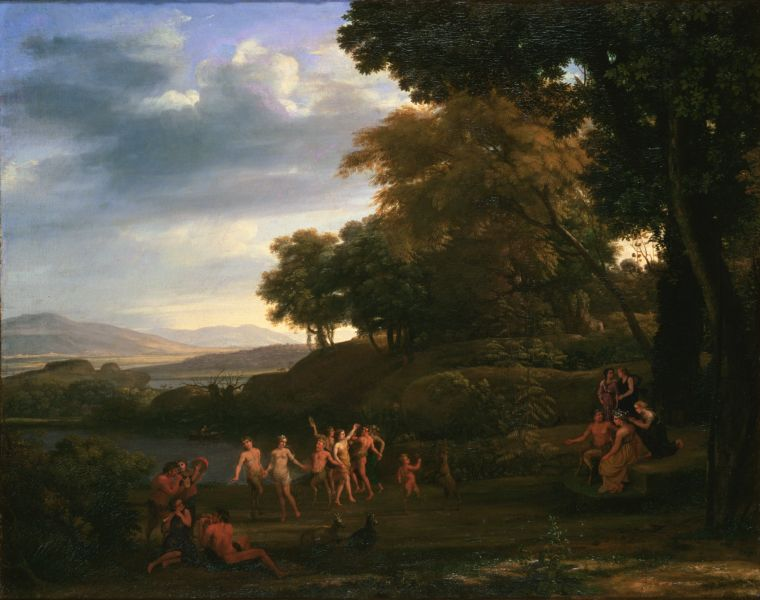
Claude Lorrain

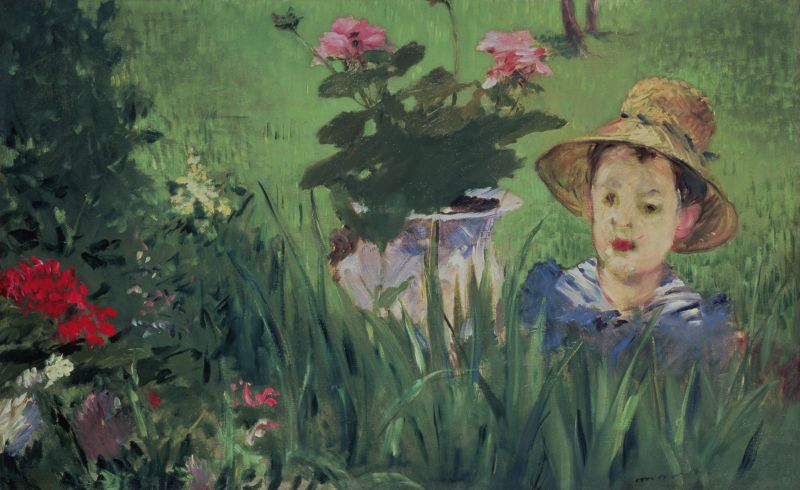
Édouard Manet

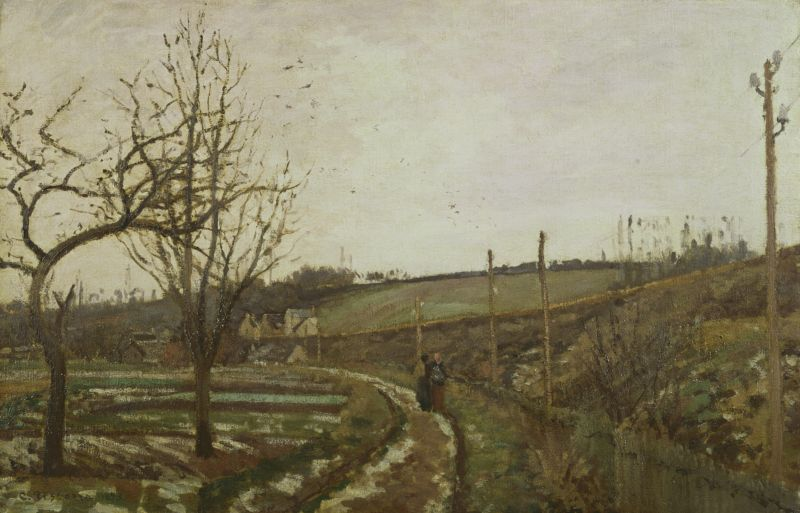
Camille Pissarro

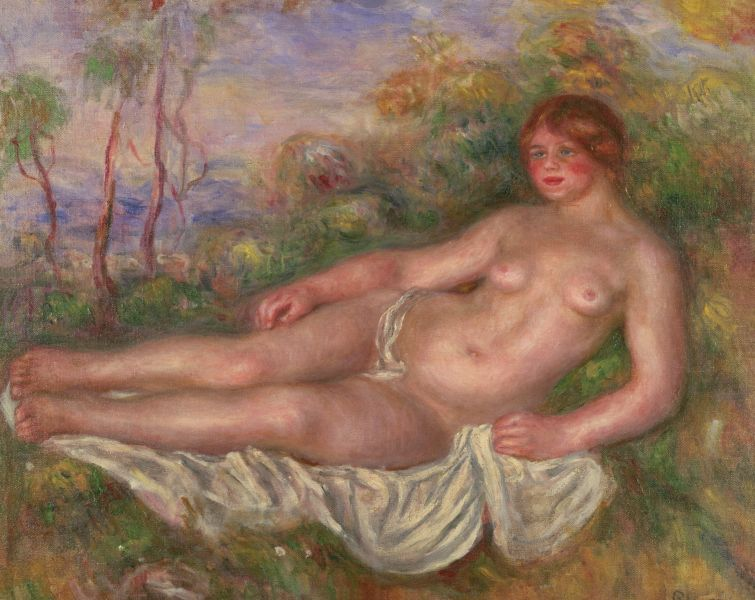
Pierre-Auguste Renoir

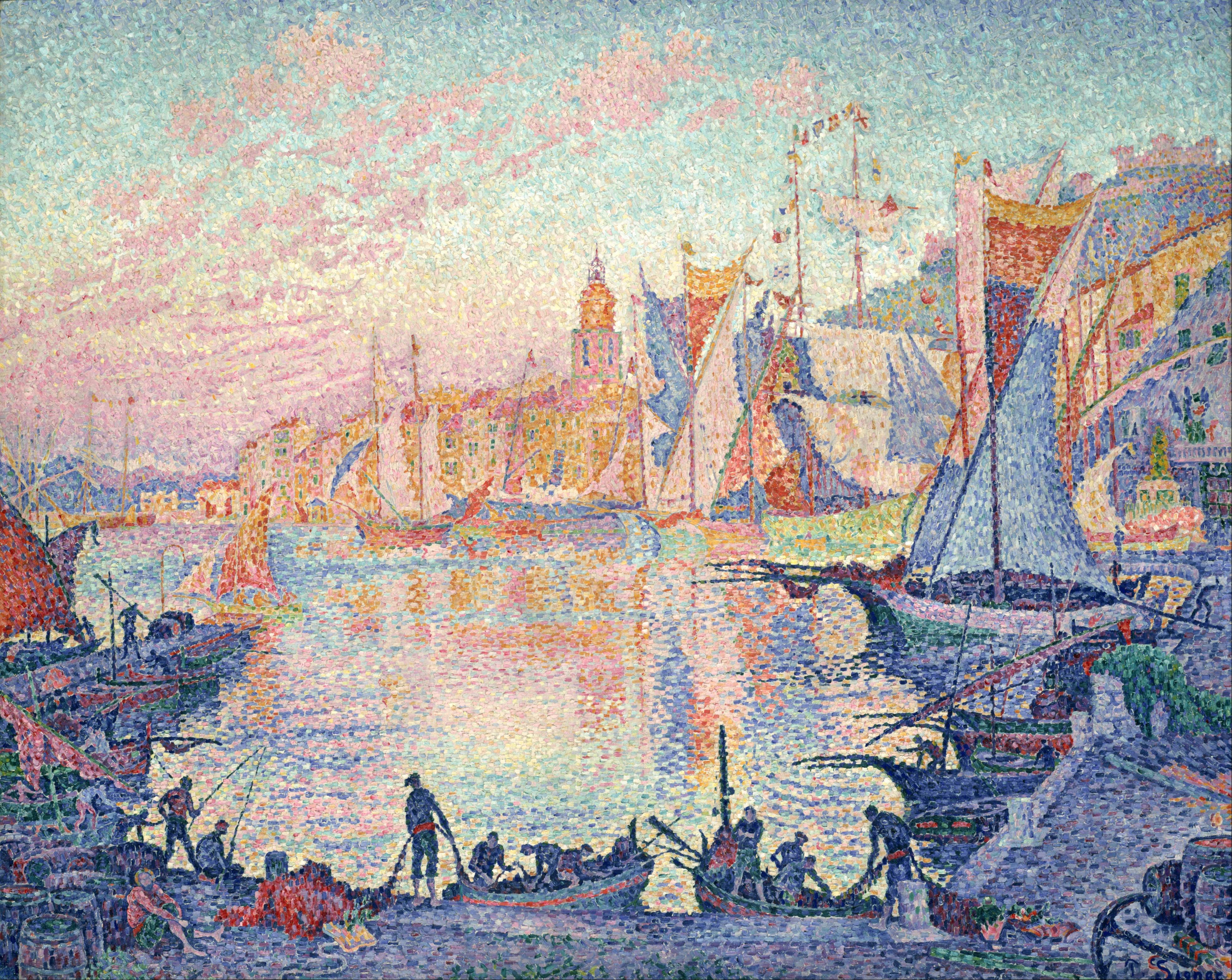
Paul Signac

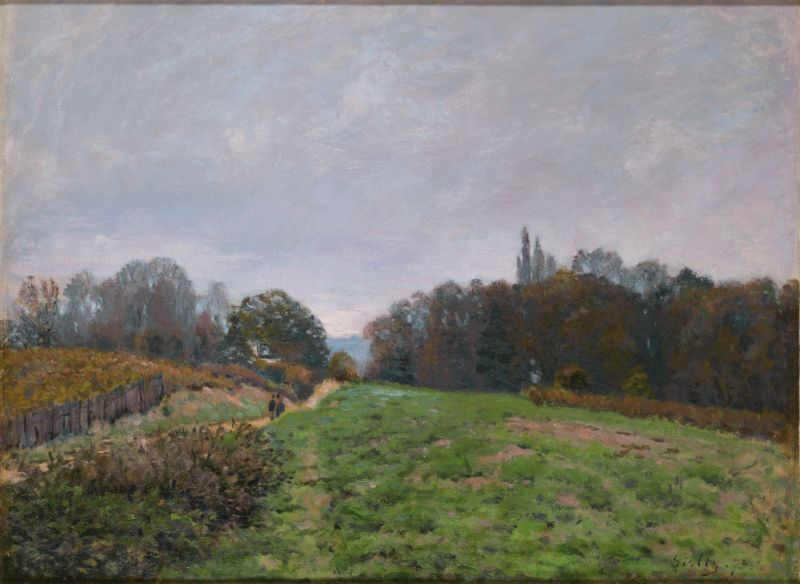
Alfred Sisley

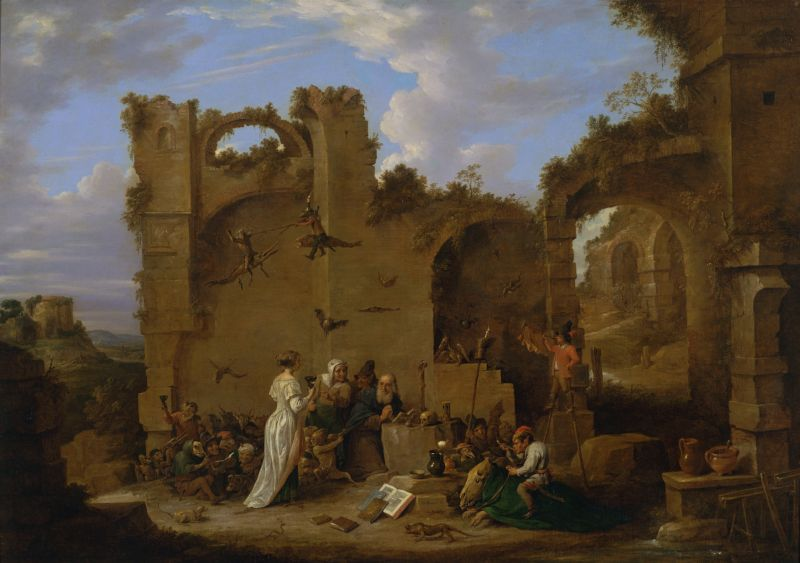
David Teniers the Younger

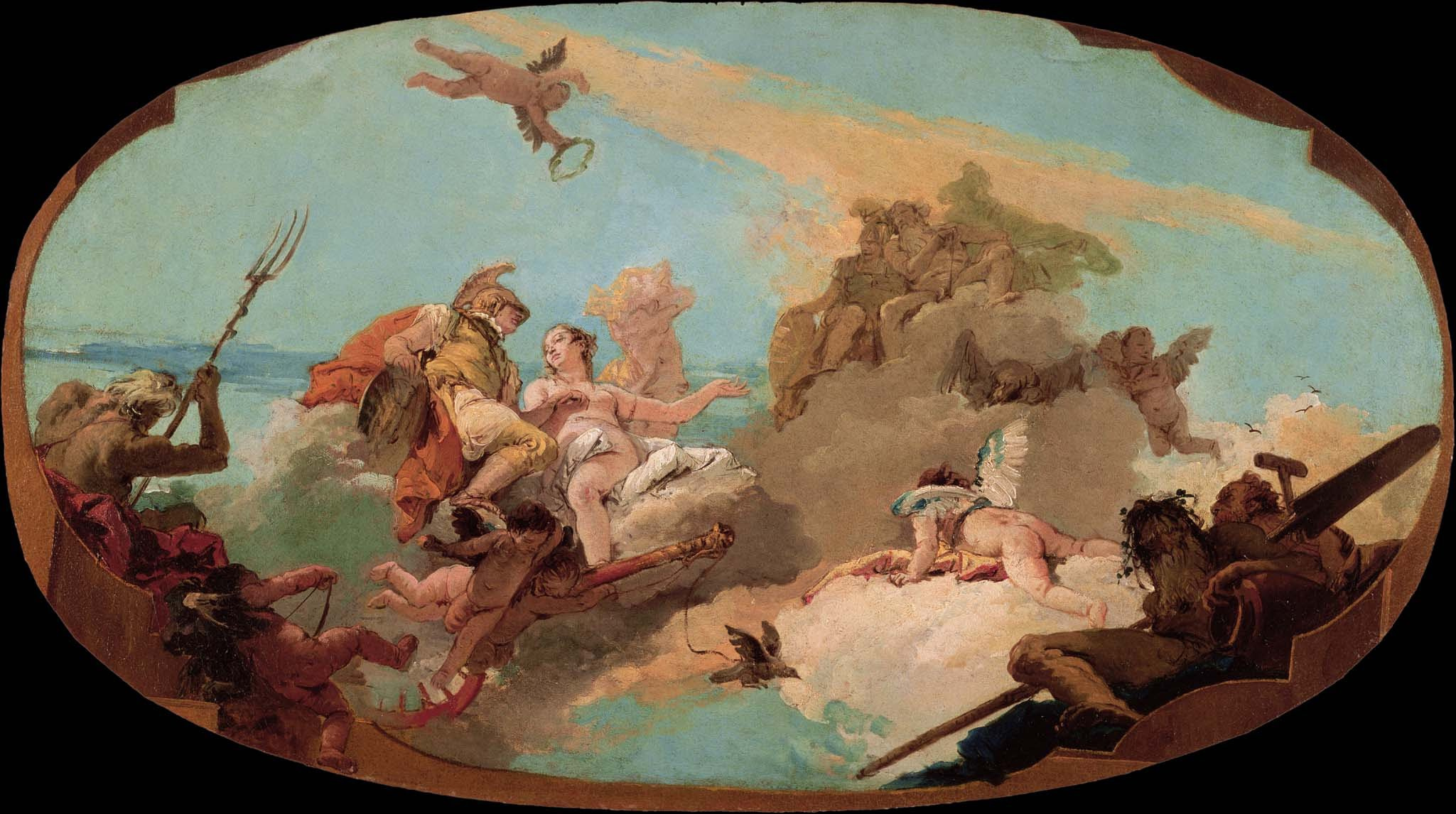
Giovanni Battista Tiepolo

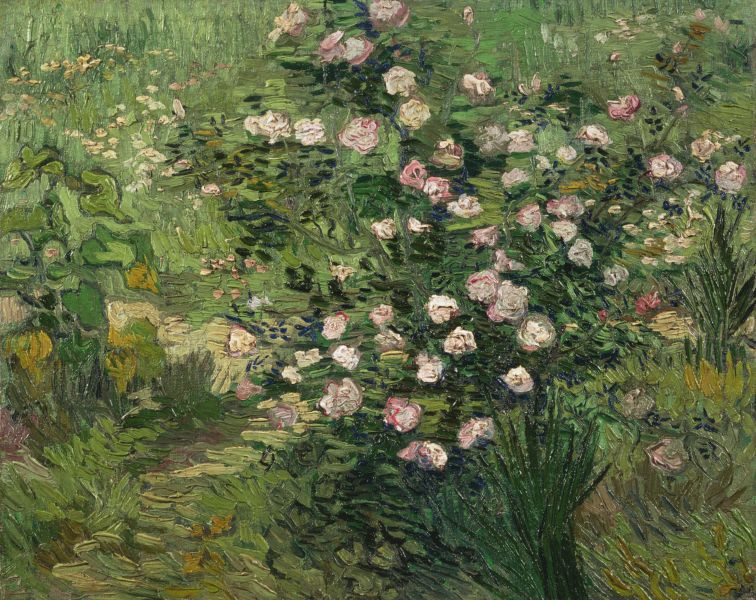
Vincent van Gogh

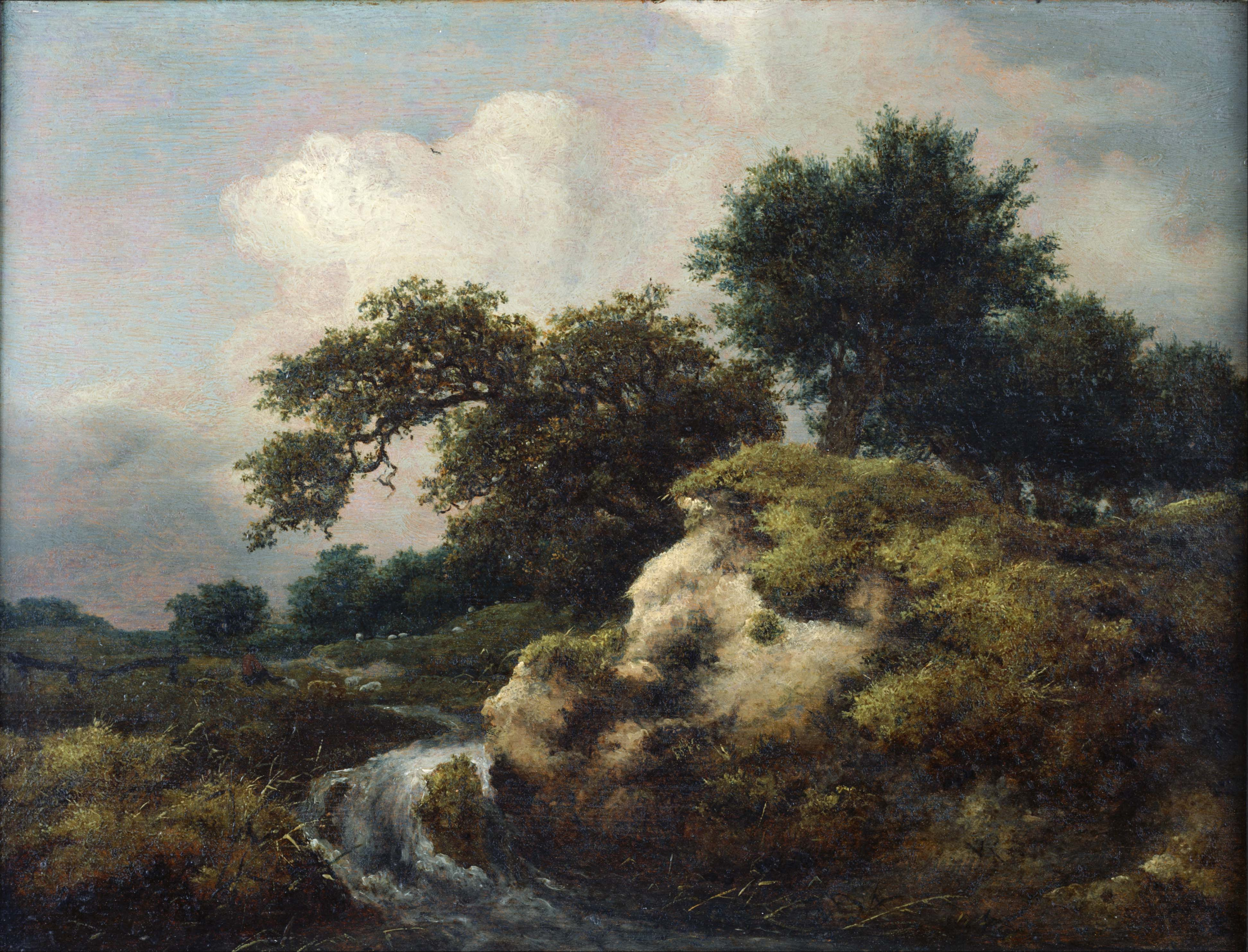
Jacob Isaakszoon van Ruisdael

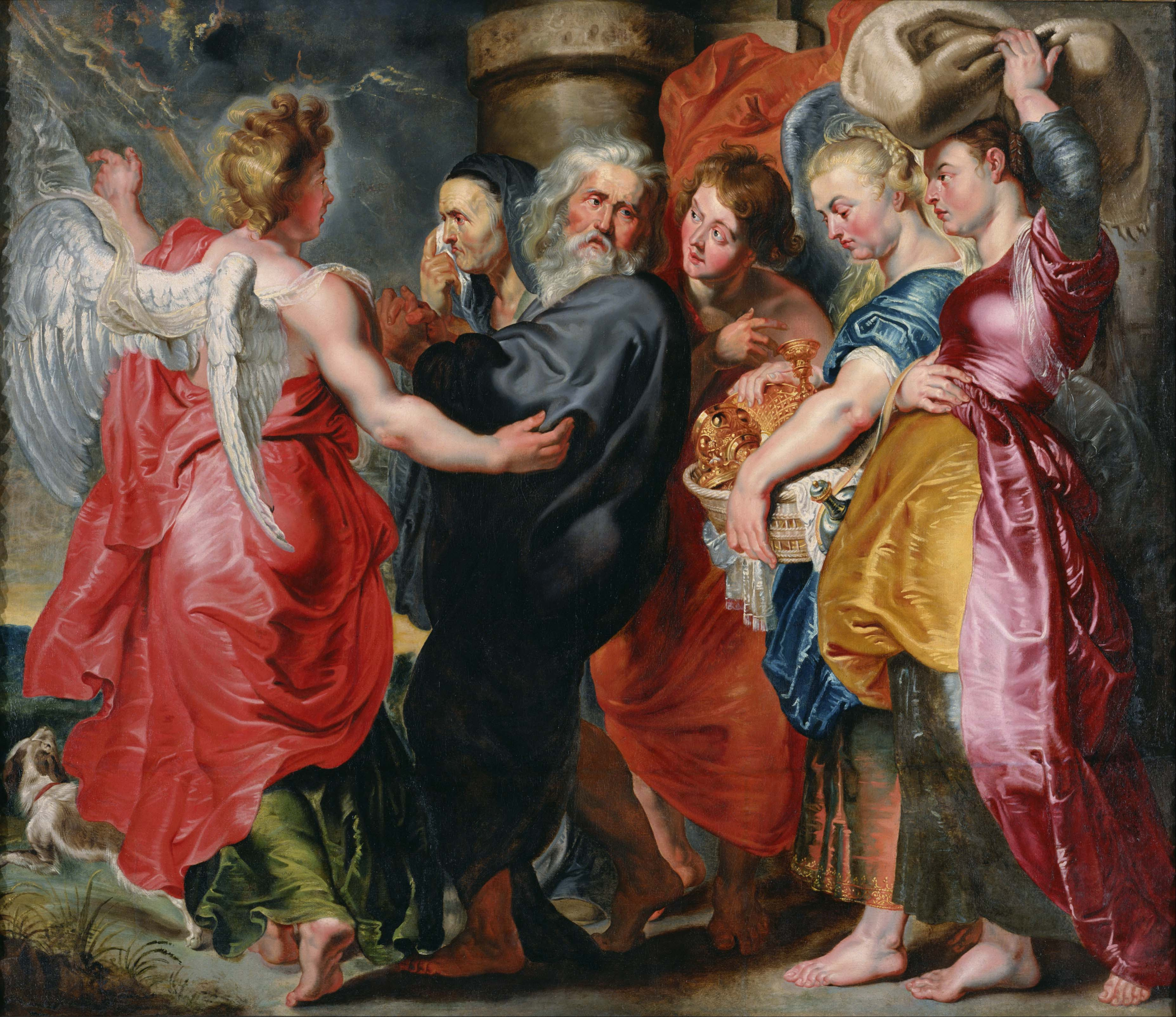
Jacob Jordaens

Paolo Veronese

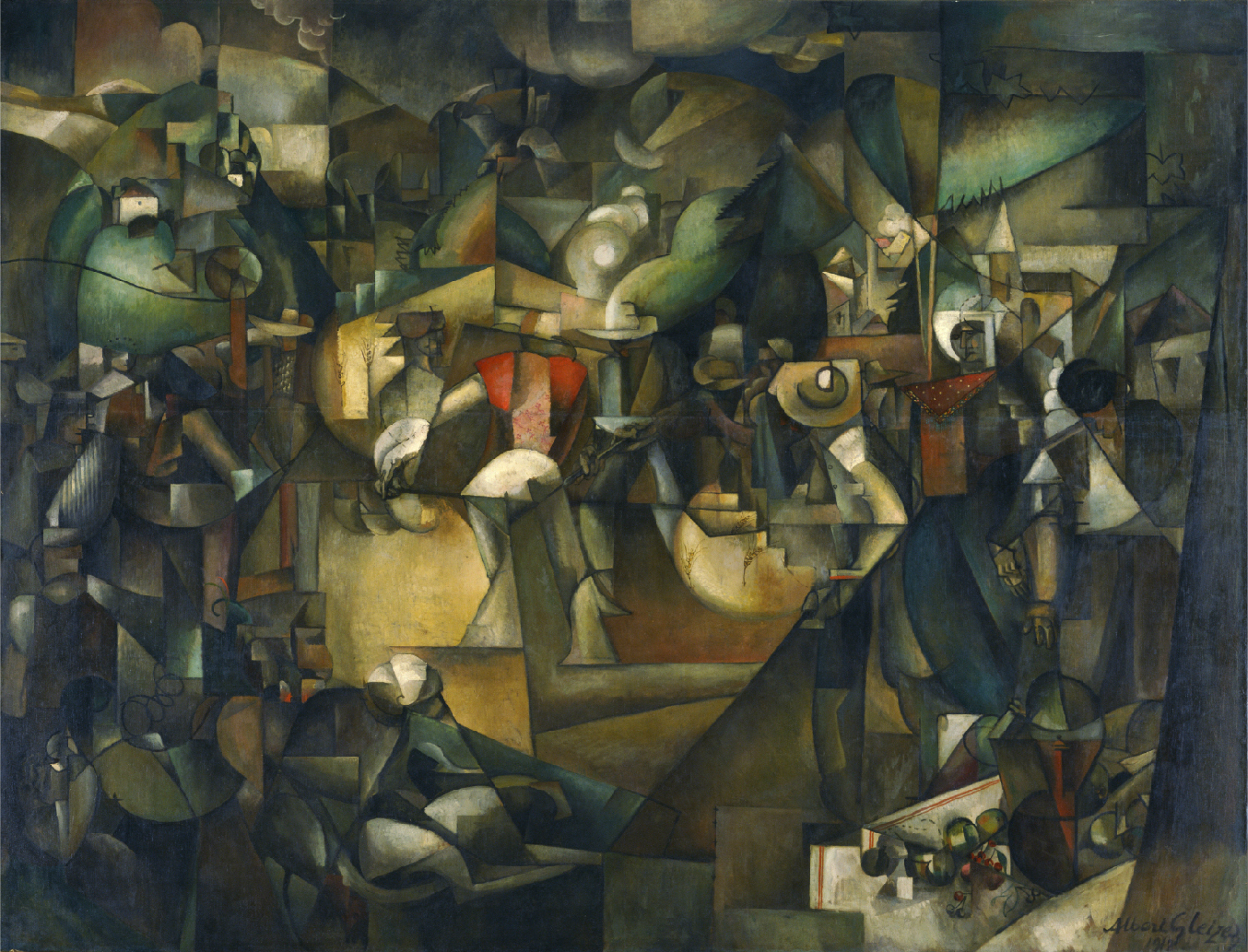
Albert Gleizes
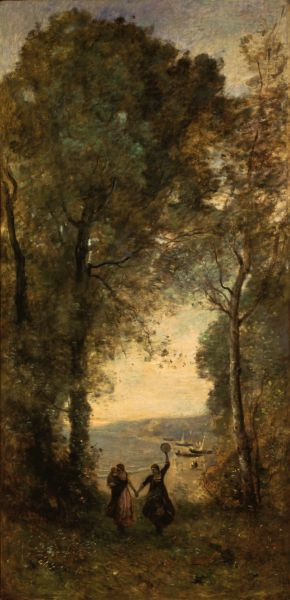
Jean-Baptiste-Camille Corot

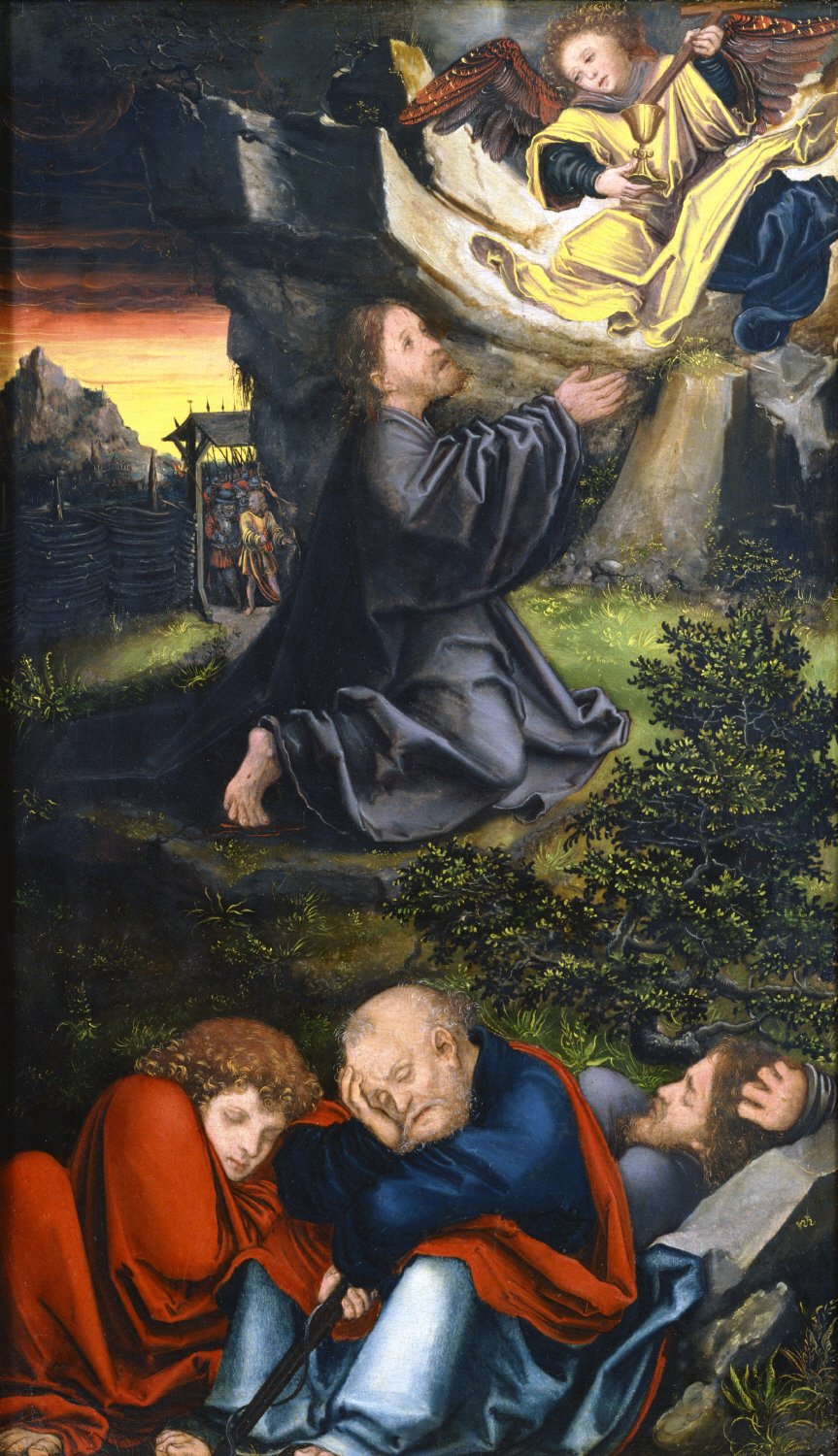
Lucas Cranach the Elder

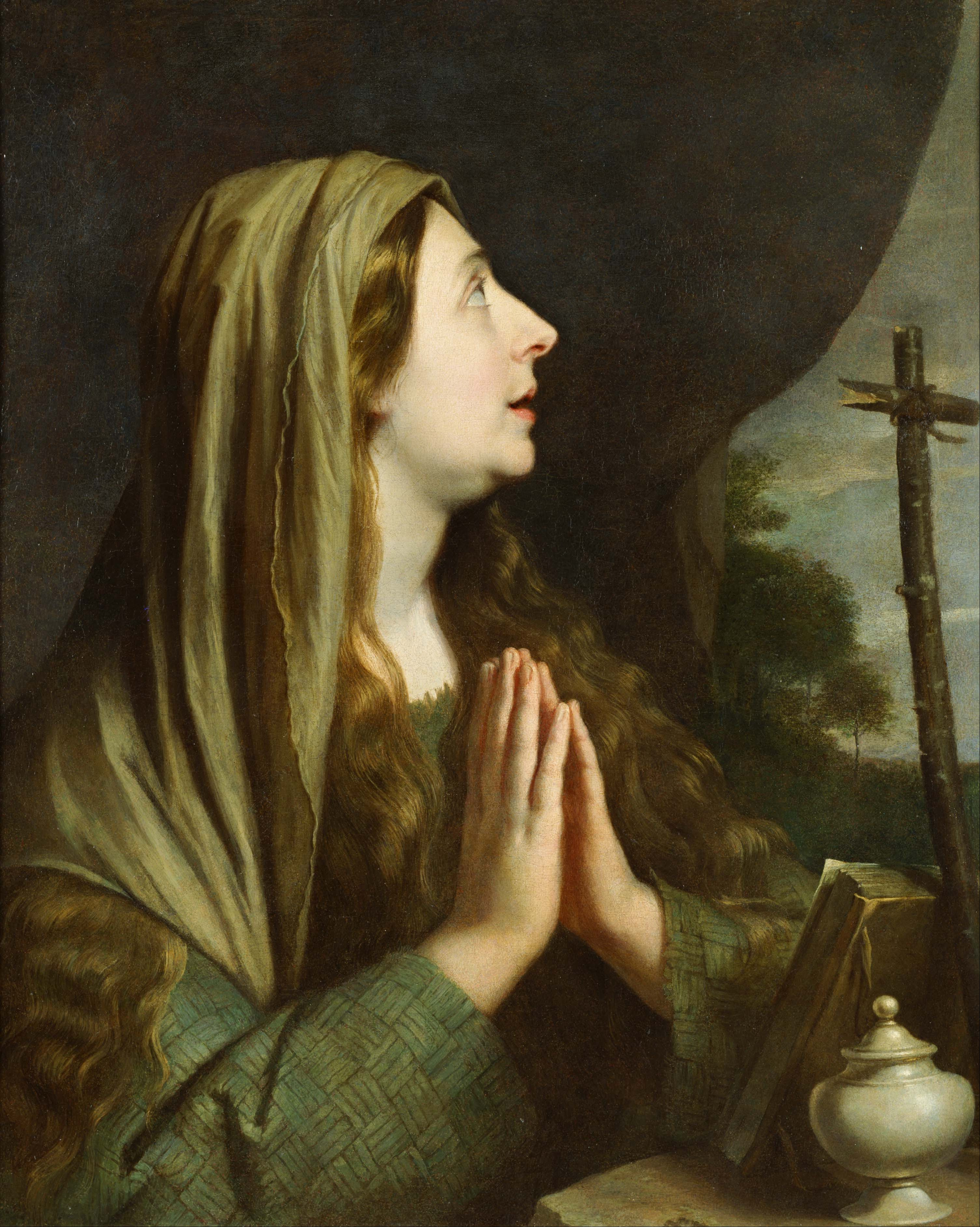
Philippe de Champaigne

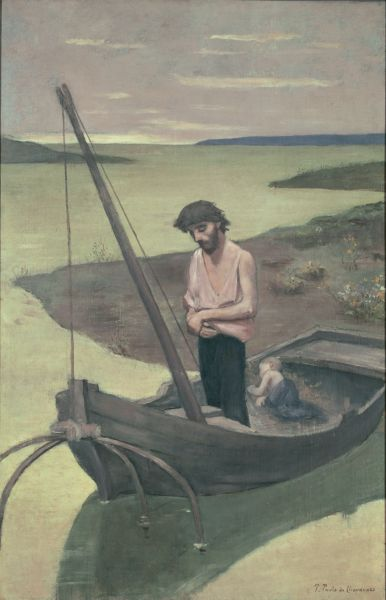
Pierre Puvis de Chavannes

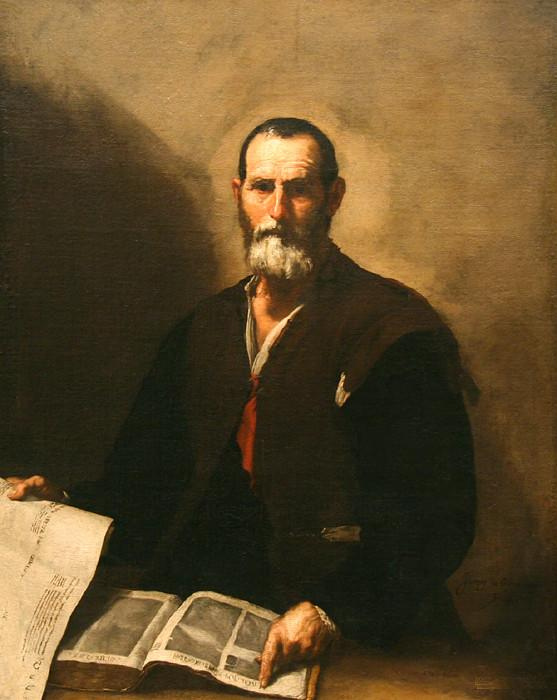
Jusepe de Ribera

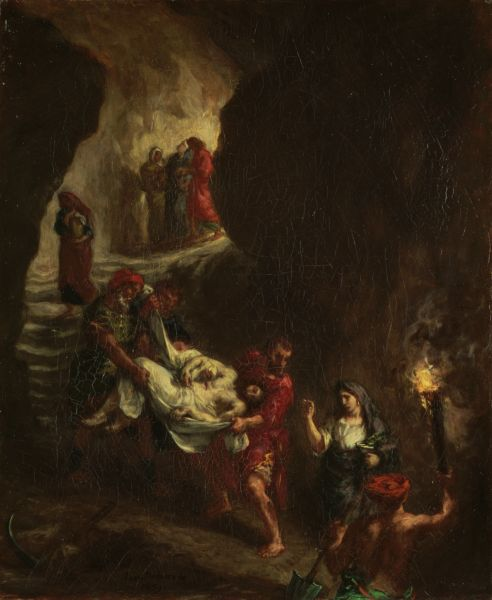
Eugène Delacroix

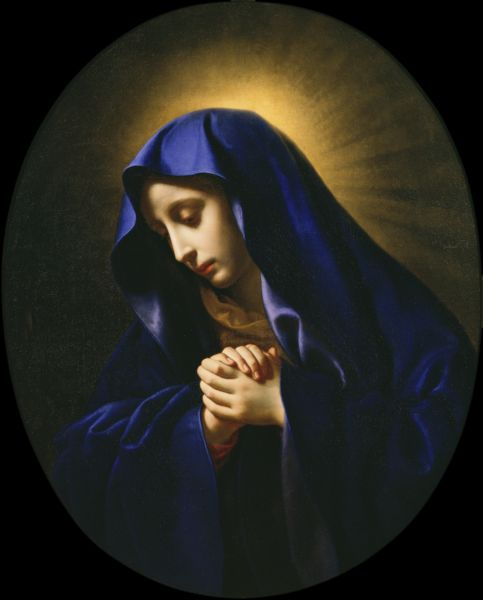
Carlo Dolci

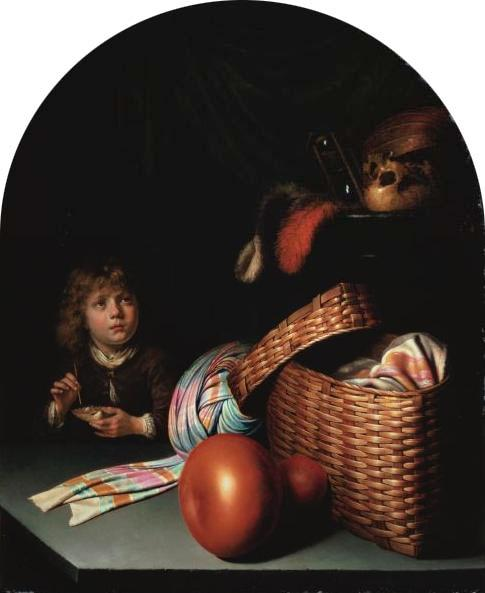
Gerard Dou

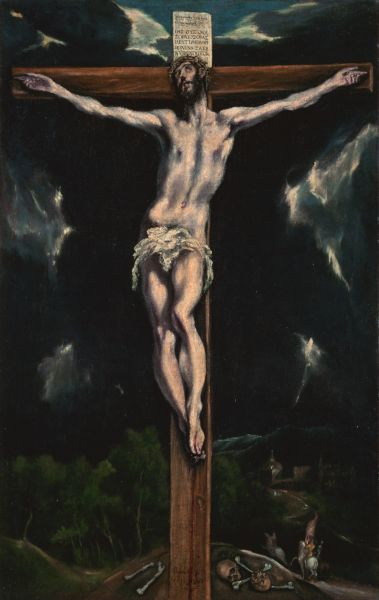
El Greco

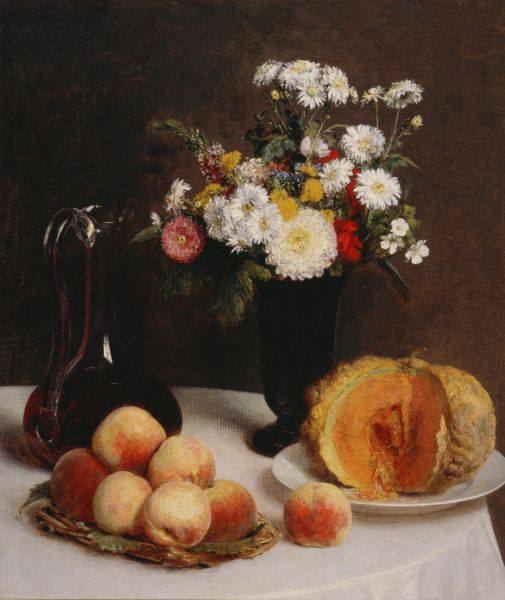
Henri Fantin-Latour

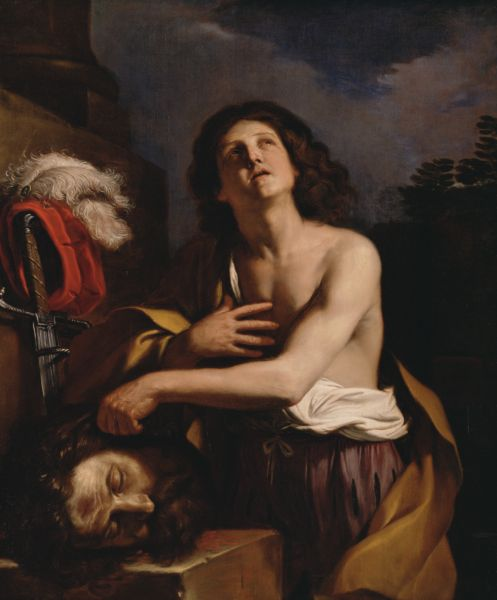
Guercino

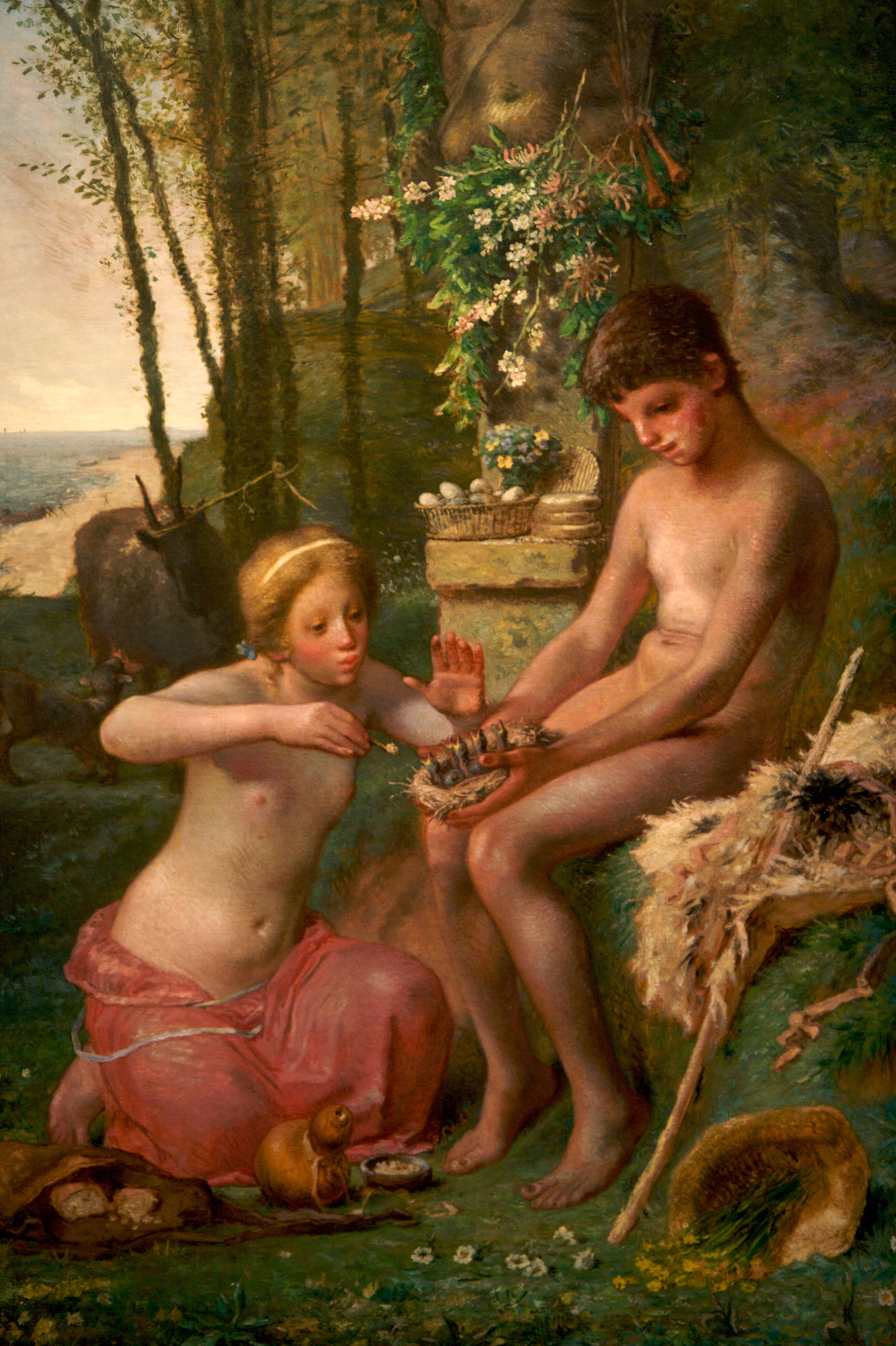
Jean-François Millet

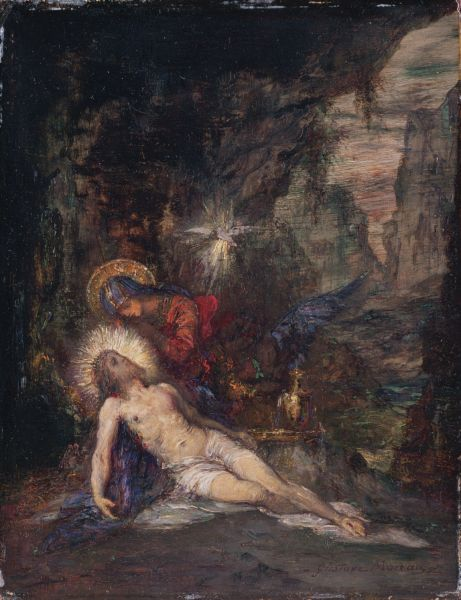
Gustave Moreau

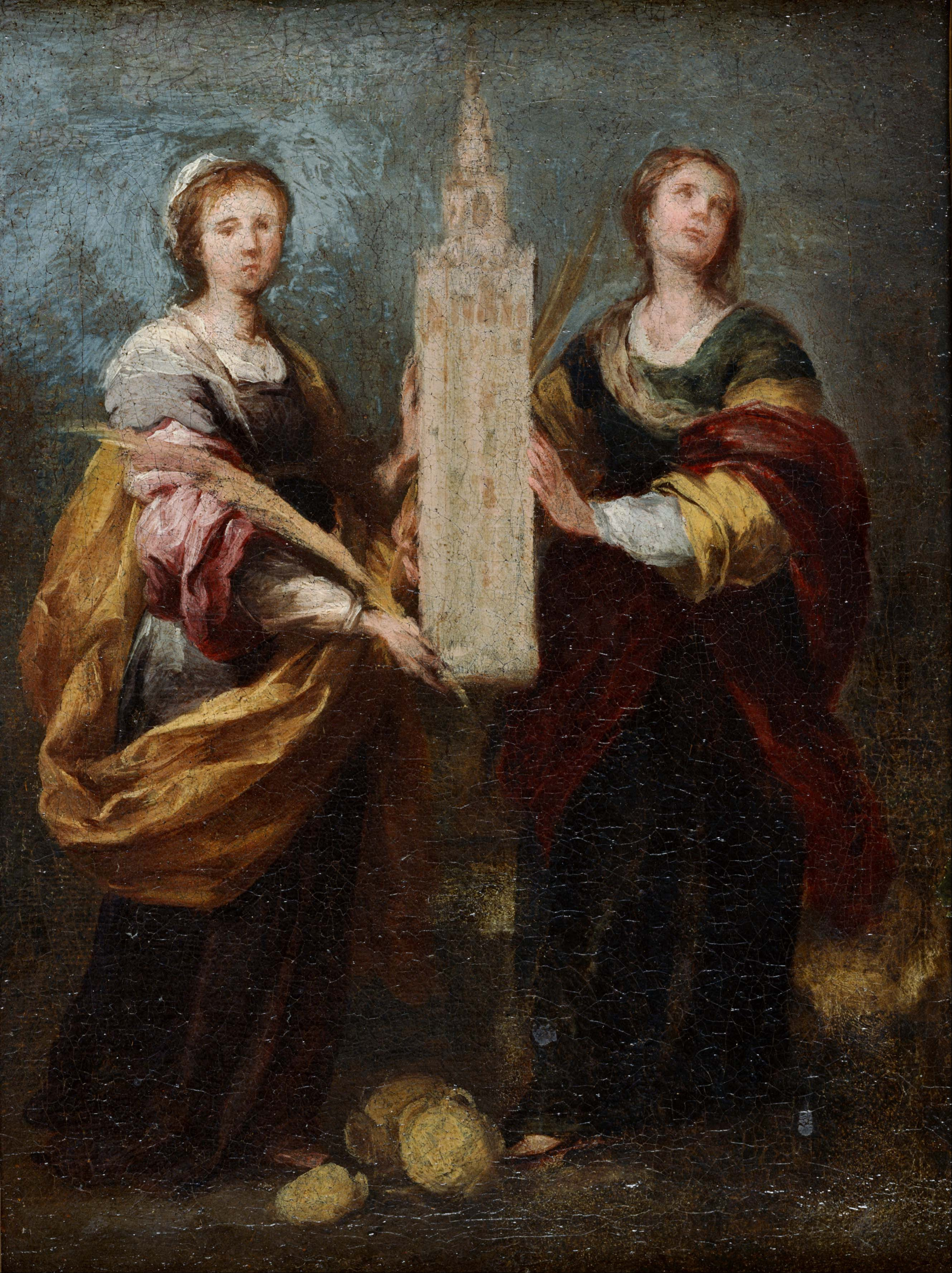
Bartolomé Esteban Murillo

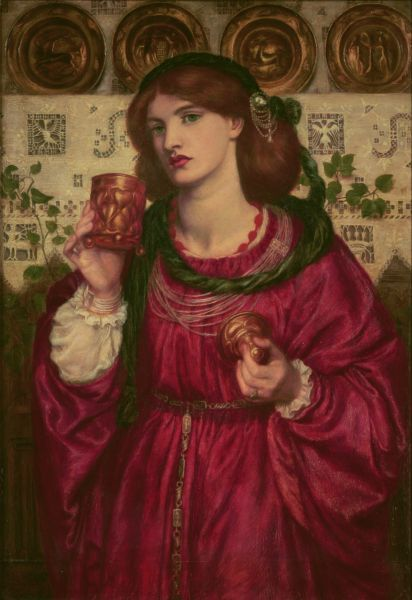
Dante Gabriel Rossetti

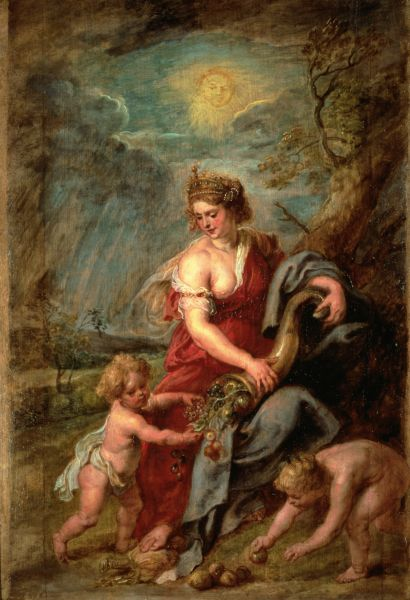
Peter Paul Rubens

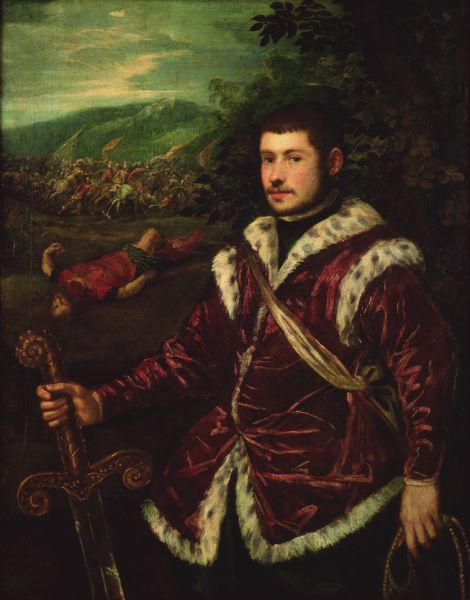
Tintoretto

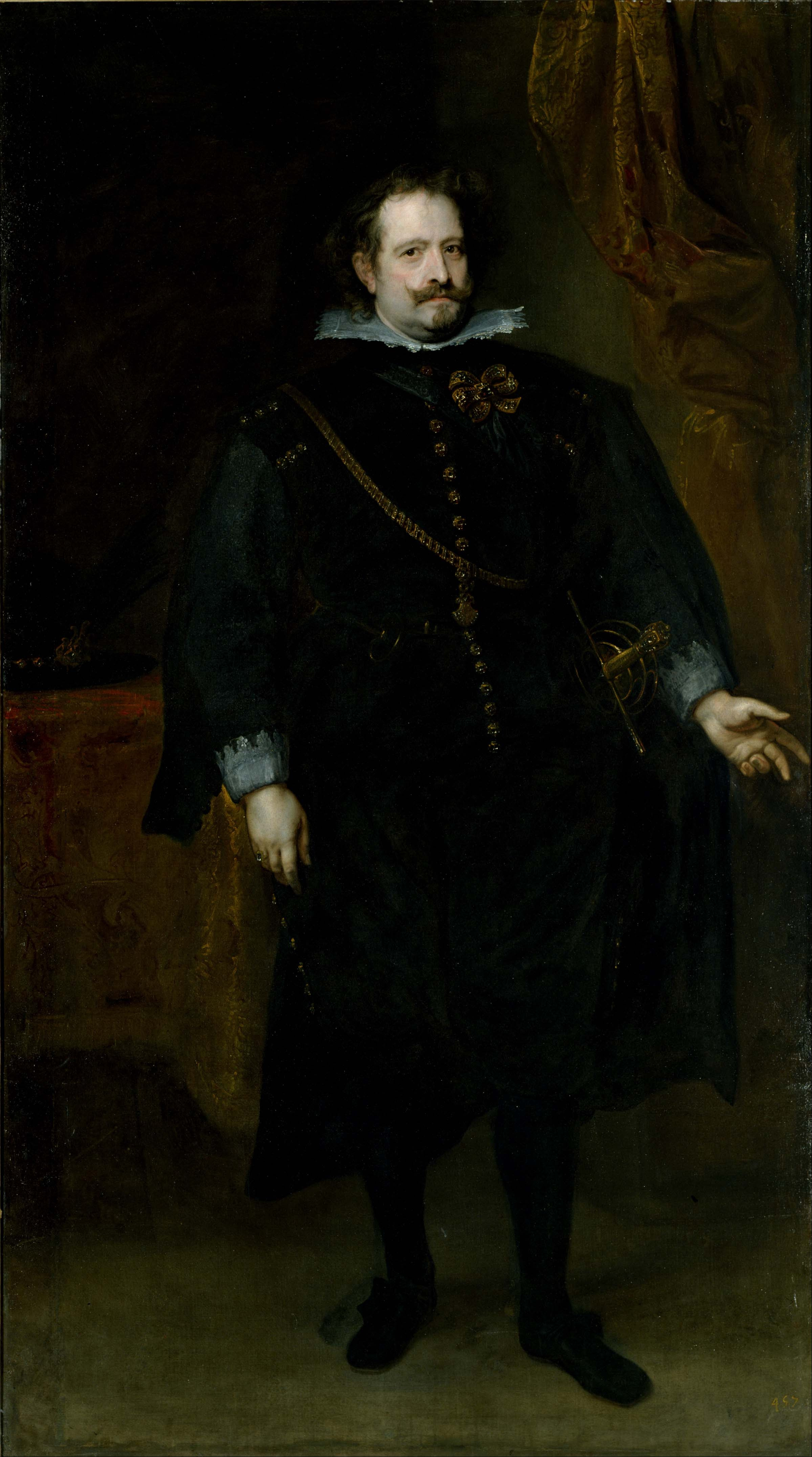
Anthony van Dyck

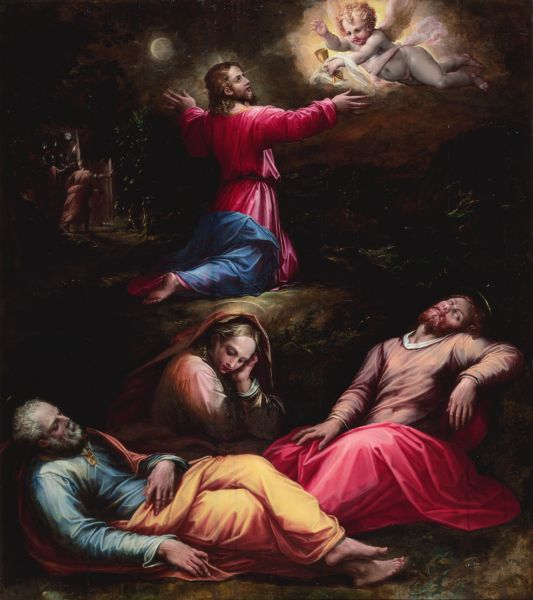
Giorgio Vasari

== See also ==
- List of Independent Administrative Institutions (Japan)

== References and sources ==
=== Sources ===
- Watanabe, Hiroshi. (2001). The Architecture of Tokyo: An Architectural History. Tokyo: Edition Axel Menges. ISBN 3-930698-93-5
- Bijutskan, Kokuritsu Seiyo. (1978). Masterpieces of the National Museum of Western Art, Tokyo. Tokyo: National Museum of Western Art.
- Sakakura Junzo, August 1959, "On the Opening of the National Museum of Western Art", Japan Architect
- Reynolds, Jonathan M. (2001). Maekawa Kunio and the Emergence of Japanese Modernist Architecture. University of California Press. ISBN 0-520-21495-1.
