= Incorporated administrative agency =

Type of legal body for organizations of the Japanese government

An incorporated administrative agency (独立行政法人, Dokuritsu gyōsei hōjin; Dokugyo in abbreviation), or independent administrative institution, is a type of legal corporation formulated by the Government of Japan under the Act on General Rules for Incorporated Administrative Agencies (Act no. 103 of 1999, revised in 2014). The independent agencies are not under the National Government Organization Act that provides for the ministries and agencies of Japan.

Originally proposed by the Administrative Reform Council, the independent agencies are created based on the concept of separating the ministries and agencies of the government into planning functions and operation functions. Planning functions remain within government-based ministries and agencies while operating functions are transferred to the independent agencies.

Incorporated Administrative Agencies utilize management methods of private-sector corporations and are given considerable autonomy in their operations and how to use their given budgets. In April 2001, the government first designated 59 bodies as the independent agencies, among which were many research institutions and some museums.

== Differences from special corporations ==
As part of the administrative reforms of the Ryutaro Hashimoto Cabinet in the latter half of the 1990s, this system was stipulated for the purpose of separating the actual business and service sectors from the central ministries and agencies.

Differences from special corporations (Japanese: 特殊法人, Hepburn: Tokushu Hōjin) are that they cannot obtain government guarantees for funding (the same as private companies) and that they are obligated to pay taxes and public dues such as corporate income tax and property tax.

According to the Administrative Surveillance Commission Investigation Office, the 108 corporations established during the six years from 1998, when the system was first established, to 2004, accounted for the fiscal 2004 administrative service implementation costs (taxpayers The total cost attributable to the public burden) was 2,095 billion yen.

== Classification ==
Independent Administrative Agencies are classified into three agency types according to Article 1 of Act no. 103 of 1999.

- Agency Managed under the Medium-Term Objectives (中期目標管理法人, Chūki Mokuhyō Kanri Hōjin)
- National Research and Development Agency (国立研究開発法人, Kokuritsu Kenkyū Kaihatsu Hōjin)
- Agency Engaged in Administrative Execution (行政執行法人, Gyōsei Shikkō Hōjin)

== Examples of the agencies ==
There are 87 agencies as of 1 April 2019.

- National Center for University Entrance Examinations, an agency that administers the National Center Test for University Admissions
- Japan Mint, the mint of Japan
- Japan Aerospace Exploration Agency (JAXA)
- Japan National Tourist Organization (JNTO)
- Japan Oil, Gas and Metals National Corporation (JOGMEC)
- National Agriculture and Food Research Organization (NARO)
- National Institute of Advanced Industrial Science and Technology (AIST)
- National Institute of Information and Communications Technology (NICT)
- National Institute for Materials Science (NIMS)
- National Institute of Technology and Evaluation (NITE)
- National Museum of Art, Tokyo National Museum of Modern Art, Tokyo (MOMAT)
- National Museum of Art, Tokyo National Museum of Western Art (NMWA)
- National Printing Bureau (NPB)
- Nippon Export and Investment Insurance (NEXI)

== See also ==
- List of National Laboratories in Japan
- Quango

== Bibliography ==
- Independent Administrative Institution National Museum. (2005) Outline of the Independent Administrative Institution National Museum. Tokyo: Independent Administrative Institution National Museum Secretariat. OCLC: 71634675
- Organisation for Economic Co-operation and Development (2002). Benchmarking Industry-science Relationships. Paris: OECD Publishing. ISBN 978-92-64-19741-1 OCLC: 49642355
