= National Institute for Educational Policy Research =

Japanese research institute

Coordinates: 35°40′17″N 139°44′55.1″E

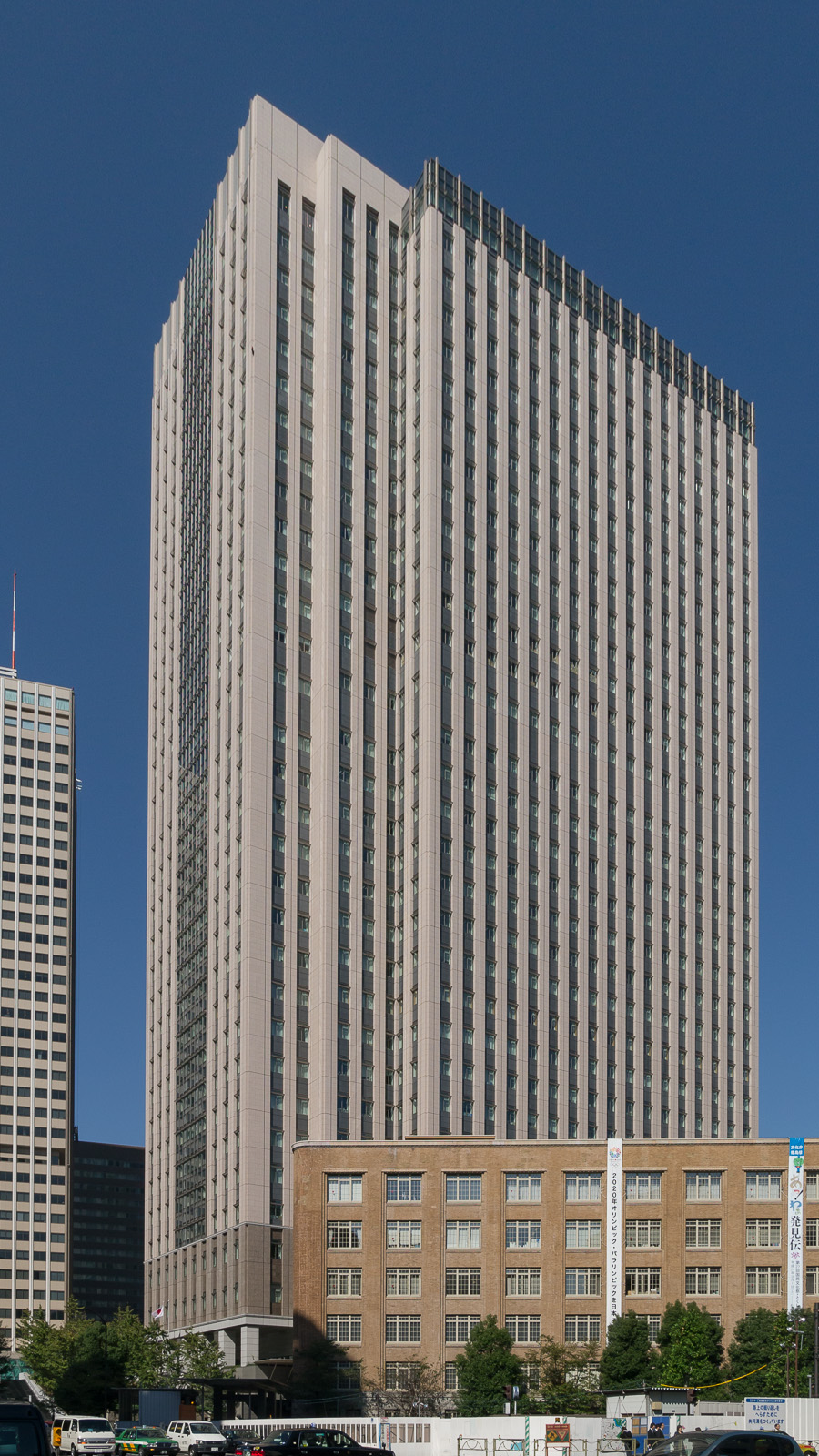
Central Government Building No. 7 in Kasumigaseki (where the National Institute for Educational Policy Research is located)

National Institute for Educational Policy Research (Japanese: 国立教育政策研究所) is a research institute located in Japanese Ministry of Education, Culture, Sports, Science and Technology. It carry out practical and basic research and surveys on education.

== History ==
The National Institute for Educational Policy Research started as the National Institute for Educational Research, which was established in June 1949 based on the provisions in the Act for Establishment of the Ministry of Education-promulgated in the same year-together with the National Museums, Institute of Statistical Mathematics, and National Institute of Genetics.

In line with the reorganization of ministries and agencies in the central government, in January 2001 the research organization was reviewed and reorganized to strengthen its role and character further as a research institute contributing to the planning, formulation, and promotion of policies on education. As part of this major restructuring and reorganization, both the Curriculum Research Center and the Guidance and Counseling Research Center were newly established to enhance specialized research, while consultation and support functions were integrated with the public administration. Additionally, its name was changed to the National Institute for Educational Policy Research, reflecting its role as a comprehensive policy research institute.
