= Leaf peeping =

Activity of viewing fall foliage

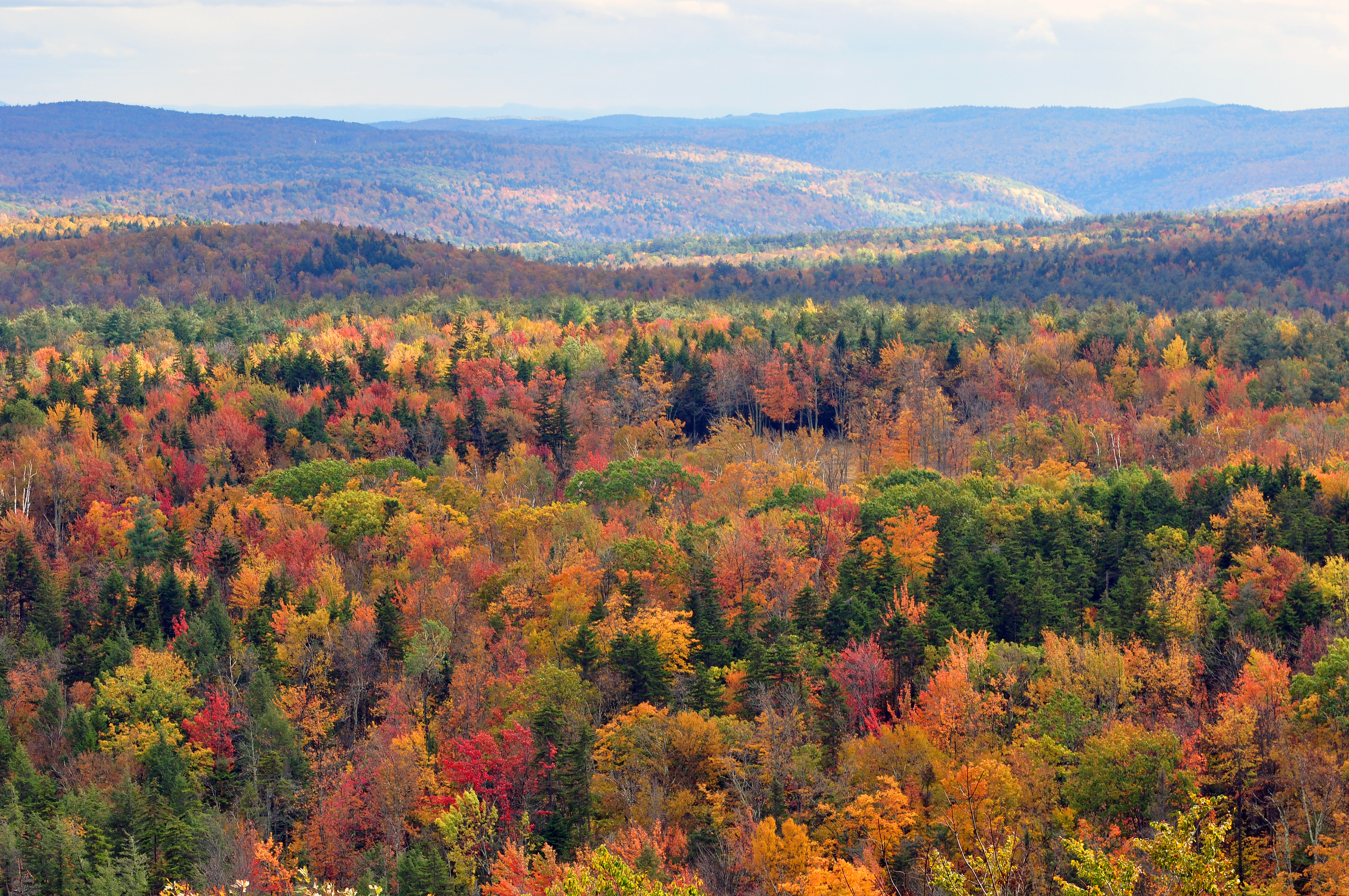
Fall-colored leaves on trees in New England, where leaf peeping is a popular activity.

Leaf peeping is the activity in which people travel to observe and photograph fall foliage. The term originated in the United States and was first mentioned in a 1966 newspaper article. Although the activity is prominent in the United States, where it is considered one of the most popular fall activities according to the National Park Service, it is also present in other countries, such as in Japan, where it is known as momijigari. Practiced since the Heian period (794–1185), the activity became widely popular in the 18th century. Prominent leaf peeping locations include those around the Kyoto and Nikkō areas, including mountains, national parks, and hot springs across the country.

In the United States, leaf peeping is popular in regions such as New England and New York, where it has significantly affected regional fall tourist activities, which have, in turn, boosted local economies. New England states have also competed amongst themselves in leaf peeping tourism by launching advertisements and offering low-cost lodging. Some state parks have also introduced viewfinders for red–green colorblind people to allow them to view fall foliage. Popular leaf peeping locations also exist in other countries, such as Ireland, the United Kingdom, and Canada.

Two groups of pigments, carotenoids and anthocyanins, produce fall-colored leaves, which are usually green throughout the year due to the high presence of the chemical chlorophyll. Once leaves change colors, they will fall from trees within days or weeks. Leaf peeping has been affected by climate change and weather occurrences, such as wildfires and hurricanes. Warm weather could make foliage occur a bit earlier, while weather occurrences make leaves wither early.

== Terminology ==
The term leaf peeping is commonly used to refer to the activity in which people travel to view and photograph leaves when they change colors, also known as fall foliage. The term originates from the United States, and according to the Oxford English Dictionary, its first usage appeared in 1966 in a Bennington Banner newspaper article. Leaf peeping is sometimes referred to as fall color tourism or simply fall tourism.

Writer Erin Vivid Riley explained that the term leaf peeping has been criticized as "childish, unpleasant, and erroneous". Journalist Devin Gordon of GQ also criticized the term, saying that it sounds filthy and humiliating, "like I've never seen red or yellow before". Writing for NPR, biologist David George Haskell considers the term peep inappropriate with regard to fall foliage due to its primary definition and peep shows. He proposed leaf wonder or autumnal awe as alternative terms.

Ruskaretki (admiring fall colors) is an activity in Finland in which people travel to see fall foliage. In Japan, the activity is known as momijigari (紅葉狩り or もみじがり; hunting autumn leaves), while locally, in the Hokkaido region of Japan, it is known as kanpukai (a get-together to enjoy the autumn foliage). In South Korea, leaf peeping is known as dan pung ku gyeong (purposeful look at the changing colors of leaves) and in China, it is known as shangye (reward or appreciation of leaves).

== Fall foliage development ==
Leaves are usually colored green throughout the year due to the chemical chlorophyll, which leaves produce from the energy of the sunlight during the process known as photosynthesis. However, during autumn, days become shorter and temperatures drop. Chlorophyll becomes less present in leaves, after which they become yellow and orange. These colors come from the pigment known as carotenoid. Red and purple leaves could also occur due to the pigment known as anthocyanin; they can be found on oaks and dogwoods. Once leaves change colors, they will fall from trees within days or weeks.

== History ==
=== Japan ===
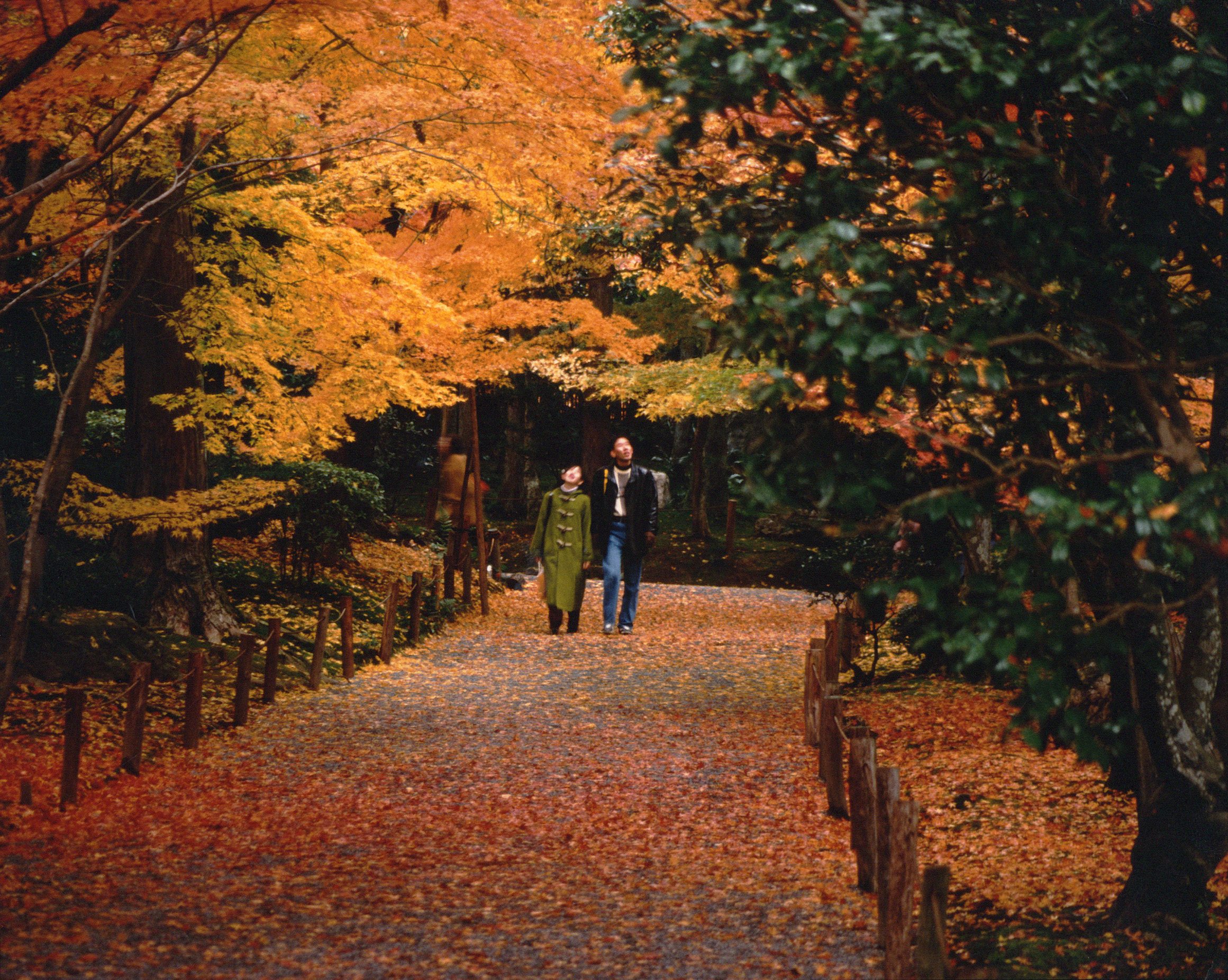
Leaf peeping (momijigari) as an activity in Japan dates back to the Heian period

Fall foliage typically appears in Japan from late October to early December. Leaf peeping has been a tradition in the country since the Heian period (794–1185). Anna Selby of The Daily Telegraph wrote that leaf peeping is "a concept embedded deep within Japanese culture", citing Shinto and Zen as examples. The activity dates back to the 11th-century classic The Tale of Genji, as well as a poem by Fujiwara Sadaie. However, according to the Japan National Tourism Organization (JNTO), the activity had only become widely popular in the 18th century.

Ginkgo, zelkova serrata, and chestnut are popular trees for leaf peeping in Japan. Selby wrote that leaf peeping is considered popular around the Kyoto area, with Canadian blogger La Carmina listing Tōfuku-ji and Kiyomizu-dera as examples. The National Geographic covered a story about leaf peeping in Kyoto in September 2023. Nikkō in the Tochigi Prefecture features Kegon Falls and Lake Chūzenji, popular leaf peeping destinations amongst the Japanese. The JNTO wrote that Miyajima Island is a "fan favourite" destination for leaf peeping, while La Carmina also listed Japanese Alps and the Daisetsuzan National Park as popular leaf peeping locations. The Mainichi Shimbun considers Mount Unzen a popular destination.

Hot springs such as Arima Onsen, Shuzenji Onsen, Iya Onsen, Yumura Onsen, and Yufuin Onsen are also popular spots among the Japanese, often featuring tourist accommodations, as well as yellow and red leaves. In Nara, the restaurant Hyakurakuso opened a public garden which attracted many leaf peeping enthusiasts.

=== United States ===
Fall foliage in the United States occurs from September to early November. Hardwood trees used for leaf peeping are found in the Eastern United States, but some are also present in the West. The Appalachian Mountains in New England particularly have temperate forests, while in the Western United States, aspen tree species are popular for leaf peeping. Types of forests that feature fall-colored leaves include Eastern deciduous, boreal, montane, temperate rainforest, Northern mixed, and coastal plain mixed evergreen forests, as well as Great Plains grasslands.

In the West, leaf peeping was popularized in the 19th century. Prominent leaf peeping locations in the United States are in New England and New York. Other notable locations include Colorado and states in the Western United States, such as Oregon, California, and Washington. Vermont is considered the fall foliage capital of the United States, where forests cover most of the state. Websites such as the Old Farmer's Almanac, SmokyMountains, and ExploreFall show when peak fall foliage occurs in each U.S. state. According to a report by Fast Company, such websites incorrectly predicted peak fall foliage in 2021, mostly due to the impacts of climate change on the activity.

The Virginia Department of Conservation and Recreation introduced viewfinders for red–green colorblind people at its state parks in 2024 to allow them to view the foliage. Ethan Howes, a red–green colorblind Natural Tunnel State Park ranger, created the plan after being inspired by viewfinders in Tennessee, which were installed in 2017 at the Great Smoky Mountains. The New York Times reported that similar viewfinders for leaf peeping were introduced at locations in Georgia, Florida, and Oregon.

=== Other countries ===
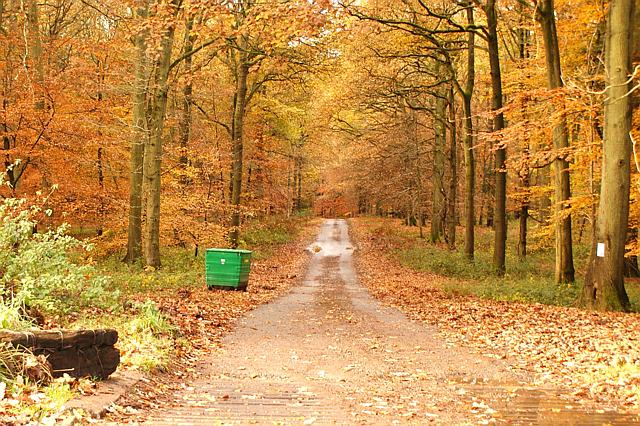
The Forest of Dean during fall.

Leaf-peeping activities were popularized in other countries, including Ireland, such as around Lough Eske. According to naturalist Ed Drewitt, the Forest of Dean in Gloucestershire is a popular tourist spot for leaf peeping in the United Kingdom. He said that during fall, leaves become "burnt brown/orange" in the region. Writing for British Vogue, Hayley Maitland listed Winkworth Arboretum, Cliveden, Stourhead, and Ashdown Forest as popular locations for leaf peeping near the London area. In Scotland, Cairngorms National Park and Loch Lomond are popular locations, where foliage peaks in late October and early November.

Canada is also a popular destination for leaf peeping. It features boreal forests, primarily found near the Atlantic Ocean. In Montreal, leaf peeping is popular in Mount Royal Park, which is home to oak and ash trees. In Vancouver, it is popular in Stanley Park, which has maple trees and Scouler's willow trees. Mount Sutton and Jacques-Cartier National Park in Quebec are also popular destinations, where visitors can see "yellows and reds".

Other popular destinations include the Black Forest National Park in Germany, where leaves "turn a vivid orange" during fall, Amsterdam in the Netherlands, and Jiuzhaigou Valley in China.

== Market ==
The National Park Service claims that leaf peeping is one of the most popular fall activities in the United States, such as in New England, where its popularity is mainly attributed to forests being in close proximity to locations with high population. New England state governments have promoted leaf peeping tourism and competed with each other by launching advertisements targeted at tourists and offering low-cost lodging in hotels and inns. As of 2007, leaf peeping was promoted by 25 state tourism offices in the United States, maintaining websites for such activities. Besides viewing fall foliage, most fall color tourists also partake in activities such as exploring small towns, shopping, dining at restaurants, visiting historic sites or parks, and engaging in outdoor recreation such as hiking. They also spend only a couple of days doing leaf peeping activities.

Considered a niche market, leaf peeping tourism has affected the economy of the United States, particularly the states in New England and New York, with New England states receiving approximately US$8 billion annually in revenue from tourist activities. The Vermont Agency of Commerce and Community Development also reported that the state receives approximately US$600 million from leaf peeping tourist activities, an increase from US$332 million in 2009. In Colorado, some mountain towns saw economic resurgence due to leaf peeping activities, while in Minnesota, more than 82 million visitors a year come to view Minnesota's fall foliage. Patrick Whittle of Associated Press wrote that a potential decrease in leaf peeping tourism could impact the economy of New England states.

== Impact of climate change ==
Fall foliage can be impacted by warm weather, while cooler weather makes leaves red due to the increase of anthocyanin production. Climate change and weather occurrences, such as wildfires and floods, have impacted leaf peeping activities due to leaves withering early and pests increasing in quantity. As a consequence of climate change, fall tends to be warmer and foliage occurs a bit earlier. In the 19th century, American chestnut trees, which would create the color yellow in fall, were exterminated by an Asian fungus in regions from Maine to Southern United States. Oaks, hickories, and maples later appeared, producing crimson- and bronze-colored leaves. Beginning in the 21st century, ash trees were also impacted by the emerald ash borer, whose larvae interrupt the circulation of plants, destroying tens of millions of such trees. According to the United States Forest Service, many hardwoods, such as sugar maples, will be impacted in the future due to climate change occurrences.

Hurricanes have also had an impact on leaf peeping activities by harming trees. Hurricane Helene was cited as an example of a cause that impacted leaf peeping activities. Droughts have also had an impact on leaf peeping activities; the color of leaves either becomes muted (due to limited photosynthesis) or trees shed their leaves earlier. In 2025, according to leaf peeping expert Jim Salge, the color of leaves peaked earlier than they were supposed to. However, a forest health program manager in Vermont said that there is still "some good-looking foliage out there in pockets."

== See also ==
- Hanami – cherry blossom viewing in Japan
- Darom Adom – flower-viewing festival in Israel

== Sources ==
=== Books ===
- Riley, Erin Vivid (2022). Leaf Peeping: Discover the Seasonal Wonder of Fall Foliage. San Francisco: Chronicle Books. ISBN 978-1-7972-1742-0.

=== Journals ===
- Kyne, Amanda; Diver, Kim (2012). "Climate Change and Autumn Colors in New England's Forests". The Northeastern Geographer. 4. Wesleyan University: 34–53.
- Crouch, Connor D.; Grady, Amanda M.; Wilhelmi, Nicholas P.; Hofstetter, Richard W.; DePinte, Daniel E.; Waring, Kristen M. (2021). "Oystershell Scale: An Emerging Invasive Threat to Aspen in the Southwestern US". Biological Invasions. 23 (9): 2893–2912. Bibcode:2021BiInv..23.2893C. doi:10.1007/s10530-021-02545-0.
- Delpierre, Nicolas; Vitasse, Yann; Chuine, Isabelle; Guillemot, Joannès; Bazot, Stéphane; Rutishauser, This; Rathgeber, Cyrille B. K. (2016). "Temperate and Boreal Forest Tree Phenology: From Organ-Scale Processes to Terrestrial Ecosystem Models". Annals of Forest Science. 73 (1): 5–25. Bibcode:2016AnFSc..73....5D. doi:10.1007/s13595-015-0477-6.
- Spencer, David M.; Holecek, Donald F. (2007). "A Profile of the Fall Foliage Tourism Market". Journal of Vacation Marketing. 13 (4): 339–358. doi:10.1177/1356766707081011.
- Spera, Stephanie A.; Spangler, Keith R.; Hubert, Olivia M.; Gorman, Marc G. (2023). "The Effects of Climate Change on the Timing of Peak Fall Foliage in Acadia National Park". Landscape Ecology. 38 (9): 2339–2355. Bibcode:2023LaEco..38.2339S. doi:10.1007/s10980-023-01703-0.
- Withiam, Glenn (December 1997). "'Tween Time in the Adirondacks". Cornell Hospitality Quarterly. 38 (6): 80. doi:10.1177/001088049703800623. ISSN 1938-9655.

=== News articles ===
- "この紅葉を平安貴族も愛でていた「1000年の紅葉」5選 永観堂、嵐山から大原野神社まで" [Five "1000-Year-Old Autumn Leaves" that Heian-era nobles also admired: From Eikan-do Temple and Arashiyama to Oharano Shrine]. The Asahi Shimbun (in Japanese). 6 August 2024. Archived from the original on 4 June 2025.
- Brown, Lynn (26 October 2025). "Leaf-peeping around the world: Where to see autumn's best colours". BBC News. Archived from the original on 18 September 2026.
- Chee Wah, Lim (5 November 2024). "The Best Times to See Autumn Leaves in Japan for 2024, According to Official Forecast". Time Out. Archived from the original on 20 October 2025.
- Cunningham, Mary (25 October 2024). "Our Fall Foliage Forecast Map Shows When Leaf Colors Will Peak In 2024". CBS News. Archived from the original on 18 September 2025.
- Devarakonda, Mythili (28 September 2023). "It's Leaf Peeping Season! Here's the Best Way to Catch the Changing Foliage This Fall". USA Today. Archived from the original on 1 October 2023.
- Fahy, Claire (8 September 2025). "6 Autumn Strolls in 6 Vibrant Cities". The New York Times. Archived from the original on 8 September 2025.
- Gianatasio, David (14 September 1998). "Battle for Leaf Peepers". Adweek. Archived from the original on 1 September 2025.
- Gordon, Devin (1 November 2017). "Fall Travel Is the Best, But Please Don't Call It "Leaf Peeping"". GQ. Archived from the original on 31 October 2026.
- Haskell, David George (15 November 2017). "'Leaf Wonder' In a World of Changing Forests". NPR. Archived from the original on 9 September 2025.
- Hirschlag, Ally (1 November 2025). "The mystery of why leaves change colour in the autumn". BBC News. Archived from the original on 18 September 2026.
- Hochberg, Emily (23 September 2025). "9 unexpected places to see fall foliage in the U.S." National Geographic. Archived from the original on 15 November 2026.
- James, Derek (20 September 2026). "Minnesota's fall foliage draws 82 million visitors a year. Here's how to make the most out of leaf peeping". CBS News. Archived from the original on 10 October 2026.
- Knoepp, Lilly (10 November 2024). "Hurricane Helene Caused Big Losses for North Carolina's Fall Tourism Industry". NPR. Archived from the original on 29 August 2025.
- La Carmina (5 October 2023). "This Might Be the Best Country for Leaf Peeping". Fodor's. Archived from the original on 8 January 2026.
- Lee, Denny (27 September 2009). "Northeastern States Woo Leaf Peepers". The New York Times. Archived from the original on 9 September 2025.
- Lillywhite, Maisie; Simpson, Maddie (15 October 2024). "The Area Becoming Britain's 'Top' Leaf Peeping Spot". BBC News. Archived from the original on 14 October 2026.
- Lindner, Emmett (28 September 2024). "Viewfinders Make Fall Foliage Pop for the Colorblind in Virginia". The New York Times. Archived from the original on 30 September 2024.
- Maitland, Hayley (15 September 2024). "12 Beautiful Places Near London to See Autumn Foliage". British Vogue. Archived from the original on 22 September 2026.
- Matsumoto, Mio (6 November 2022). "Visitors enjoy vibrant fall colors on Nagasaki Pref. mountain". Mainichi Shimbun. Archived from the original on 18 November 2022.
- Mattise, Jonathan (1 November 2017). "Viewfinders Unveil Tennessee Fall Colors for the Colorblind". The Times of Northwest Indiana. Archived from the original on 10 November 2024.
- Meyer, Zlati (20 October 2021). "Fall Foliage Prediction Maps Were Wildly Wrong in 2021. Here's Why". Fast Company. Archived from the original on 20 October 2021.
- Okamoto, Satoshi (16 November 2026). "Rail journey leads to hidden gems in peak foliage season". The Asahi Shimbun. Archived from the original on 16 November 2026.
- Ortiz, Aimee (17 October 2025). "Drought Mutes Northeast Leaf-Peeping Season". The New York Times. Archived from the original on 17 October 2025.
- Perry, Nick; Casey, Michael; Whittle, Patrick (15 October 2024). "Leaf-Peepers Are Flocking to See New England's Brilliant Fall Colors". Associated Press. Archived from the original on 26 December 2024.
- Rice, Doyle (20 September 2024). "Where Is the Best Fall Foliage? Maps and Forecast for Fall Colors". USA Today. Archived from the original on 20 September 2024.
- Rice, Doyle; Loehrke, Janet (1 September 2024). "2024 Fall Foliage Predictions: These Maps Show When and Where to See Peak Colors". USA Today. Archived from the original on 12 November 2024.
- Selby, Anna (5 October 2024). "Forget New England – Japan is the Perfect Autumn Destination". The Daily Telegraph. Archived from the original on 5 October 2024.
- Sherrod, Brian (20 September 2026). "Colorado transportation experts offer advice for best leaf peeping experience". CBS News. Archived from the original on 21 September 2026.
- Suzuko (27 November 2021). "万葉集の時代からあった紅葉狩り 遠出せずとも楽しめる都内の穴場は？" [Autumn leaf viewing has been a tradition since the Manyoshu era. What are some hidden gems in Tokyo where you can enjoy it without having to travel far?]. The Asahi Shimbun (in Japanese). Archived from the original on 16 November 2025.
- Takahashi, Kazuki (7 November 2026). "紅葉シーズンはまだ終わらない！今からでも「紅葉狩り」を楽しめる温泉地５選" [The autumn foliage season isn't over yet! Five hot spring resorts where you can still enjoy viewing the autumn leaves.]. Yahoo News (in Japanese). Archived from the original on 8 November 2026.
- Taylor, Mark Parren (29 September 2023). "Photo Story: Autumn Leaf-Peeping Season in Kyoto". National Geographic. Archived from the original on 20 February 2026.
- Treisman, Rachel (22 September 2025). "When will fall foliage peak near you? Here are some leaf-peeping predictions". NPR. Archived from the original on 26 September 2026.
- Vora, Shivani (26 September 2018). "Eight Affordable Fall Foliage Getaways". The New York Times.
- Whittle, Patrick (30 September 2021). "Why Climate Change Is Making It Harder to Chase Fall Foliage". Associated Press. Archived from the original on 16 October 2025.
- Whittle, Patrick (21 September 2024). "The Midwest Could Offer Fall's Most Electric Foliage but Leaf Peepers Elsewhere Won't Miss Out". Associated Press. Archived from the original on 2 September 2025.
- Whittle, Patrick; Casey, Michael (14 October 2025). "Drought has muted this year's leaf-peeping season, but pockets of brilliant colors remain". Associated Press. Archived from the original on 14 October 2025.
- Williams, Kale (22 October 2025). "Portland's Rhododendron Garden is exploding with fall colors". Axios. Archived from the original on 20 September 2026.
- Wilson, Spencer (7 October 2025). "Colorado mountain towns see limited economic boost from fall leaf-peeping tourists". CBS News. Archived from the original on 20 September 2026.
- Yasukochi, Takashi (29 November 2025). "奈良の料亭・百楽荘、1万坪の庭園を初開放 紅葉狩りに多くの来園者" [Hyakurakuso, a traditional Japanese restaurant in Nara, opens its 10,000-tsubo (approximately 33,000 square meter) garden to the public for the first time, attracting many visitors who come to enjoy the autumn foliage.]. The Asahi Shimbun (in Japanese). Archived from the original on 29 November 2025.

=== Websites ===
- "leaf peeping". Oxford English Dictionary. 18 November 2024. Archived from the original on 4 September 2025.
- "Momijigari: How To Enjoy Autumn in Japan and the UK". Japan National Tourism Organization. 4 October 2021. Archived from the original on 13 July 2026.
- "Why do leaves change color in the fall?". Smithsonian Institution. 21 September 2021. Archived from the original on 31 August 2023.
