= Ninomiya =

Ninomiya (written: 二宮 or 二ノ宮 lit. "second shrine") may refer to:

== Places ==
- Ninomiya, Kanagawa
- Ninomiya, Tochigi
- Ninomiya Station

== Other uses ==
- Ninomiya (shrine), a classification of Shinto shrine
- Ninomiya (surname)

== See also ==
- Noto-Ninomiya Station
- Hōtoku Ninomiya Shrine, Japanese Shinto shrine in Odawara, Kanagawa dedicated to Ninomiya Sontoku
