= Ninomiya (surname) =

Ninomiya (written: 二宮 or 二ノ宮 lit. "second shrine") is a Japanese family name.

== Notable people ==
=== General ===
- Ayano Ninomiya, award-winning Japanese violinist
- Chūhachi Ninomiya, Japanese inventor and aviation pioneer
- Kazunari Ninomiya, member of the band Arashi and an actor in the 2006 film Letters from Iwo Jima
- Kent Ninomiya, first male Asian American to be a primary news anchor of a US television station
- Ninomiya Sontoku (born Ninomiya Kinjirō), prominent 19th-century Japanese agricultural leader, philosopher, moralist and economist, whose statues of him reading while walking are commonly seen near Japanese schools
- Tei Ninomiya, first Asian student at Smith College, later an administrator for YWCA in Japan
- Tomoko Ninomiya, Japanese manga artist

=== Athletics ===
- Hiroshi Ninomiya (born in 1937), Japanese football player and manager
- Hiroshi Ninomiya (born in 1969), Japanese football player
- Hirokazu Ninomiya, Japanese football player and manager
- Jōkō Ninomiya, Grandmaster, founder and director of Enshin Karate
- Kazuhiro Ninomiya, 1976 Olympic gold medalist and two-time world judo champion
- Makoto Ninomiya, Japanese tennis player
- Miho Ninomiya, Japanese judoka

== Fictional characters ==
- Ninomiya, the main character in the light novel series Goshūshō-sama Ninomiya-kun
- Ninomiya-kun, of the fictional Sensei and Ninomiya in Minami-ke
- Rui Ninomiya (爾乃美家 累), a character in the anime series Gatchaman Crowds
- Fuu Ninomiya (二宮 フウ), a character from Little Battlers Experience WARS
- Sui Ninomiya (二宮 スイ), a character from Little Battlers Experience WARS
- Youhei Ninomiya, one of the students in the audio-drama series ”Tetro Danganronpa Blue”

== Eponyms ==
- Nielsen–Ninomiya theorem, a no-go theorem in physics by Holger Bech Nielsen and Masao Ninomiya
- Hōtoku Ninomiya Shrine, Japanese Shinto shrine in Odawara, Kanagawa dedicated to Ninomiya Sontoku

== See also ==
- Ninomiya (disambiguation), especially for place-related uses
