= Autumn leaf color =

Phenomenon that affects the leaves during autumn

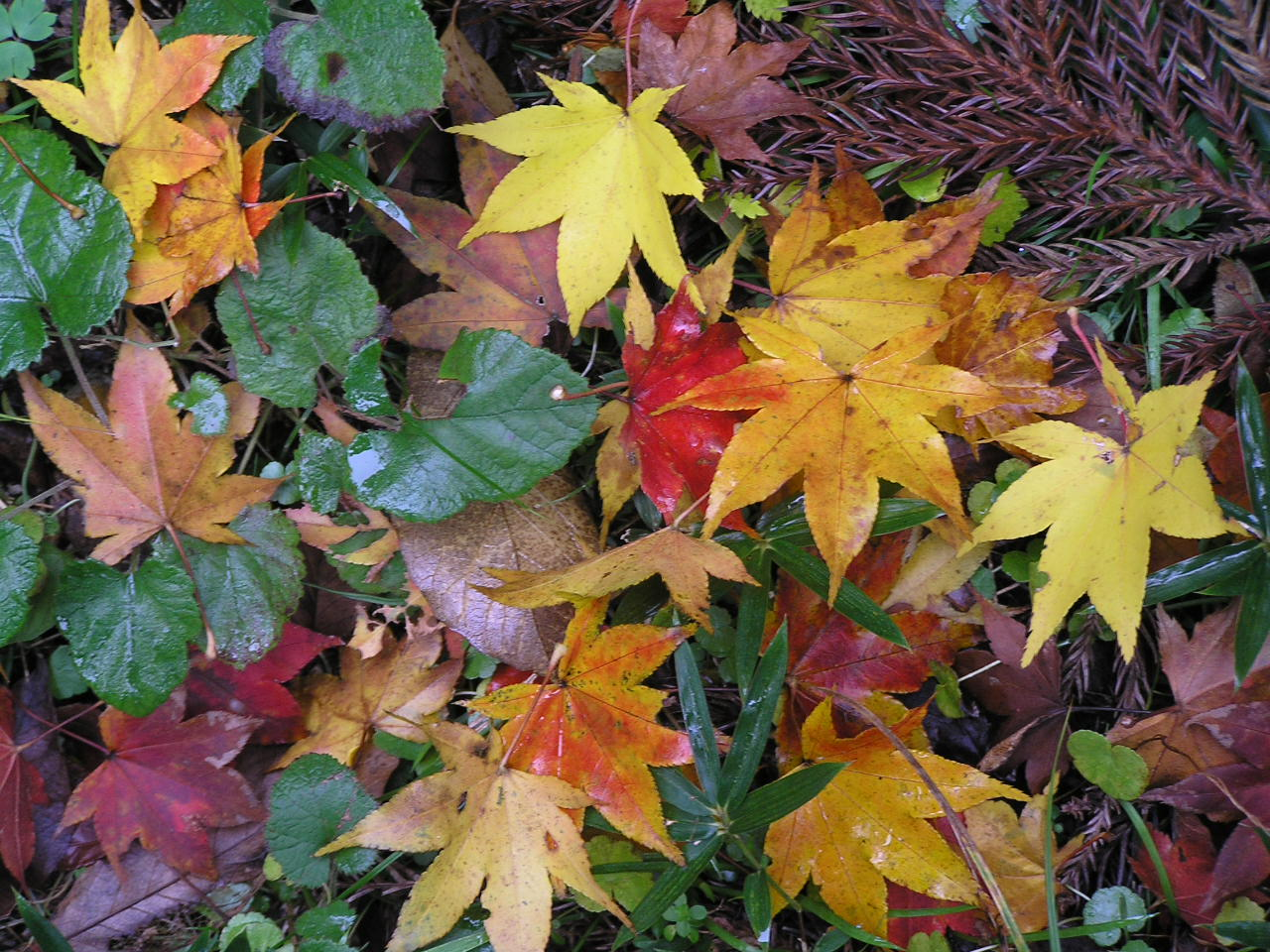
Japanese maple autumn leaves

Autumn leaf color is a phenomenon that affects the normally green leaves of many deciduous trees and shrubs by which they take on, during a few weeks in the autumn season, various shades of yellow, orange, red, purple, and brown. The phenomenon is commonly called autumn colours or autumn foliage in British English and fall colors, fall foliage, or simply foliage in American English.

In some areas of Canada and the United States, "leaf peeping" tourism is a major contribution to economic activity. This tourist activity occurs between the beginning of color changes and the onset of leaf fall, usually around September to November in the Northern Hemisphere and March to May in the Southern Hemisphere.

== Components of leaf color change ==
The change in color in autumn has two main components: the losing of the green color of chlorophyll and the gaining of the red color of anthocyanins. The yellow color of autumn leaves is due to carotenoids, the yellow xanthophylls and orange beta-carotene, which are already present in the leaf but simply masked by the intense green of chlorophyll during summer. The degradation of chlorophyll into colorless tetrapyrroles known as nonfluorescent chlorophyll catabolites can be explained by senescence, but the production of anthocyanins is an active process. Some leaves also appear brown: this can be due to the colors of chlorophyll (green) and anthocyanin (red) combining during early senescence, or by the polymerization of quinones during cell death in late senescence.

=== Chlorophyll ===
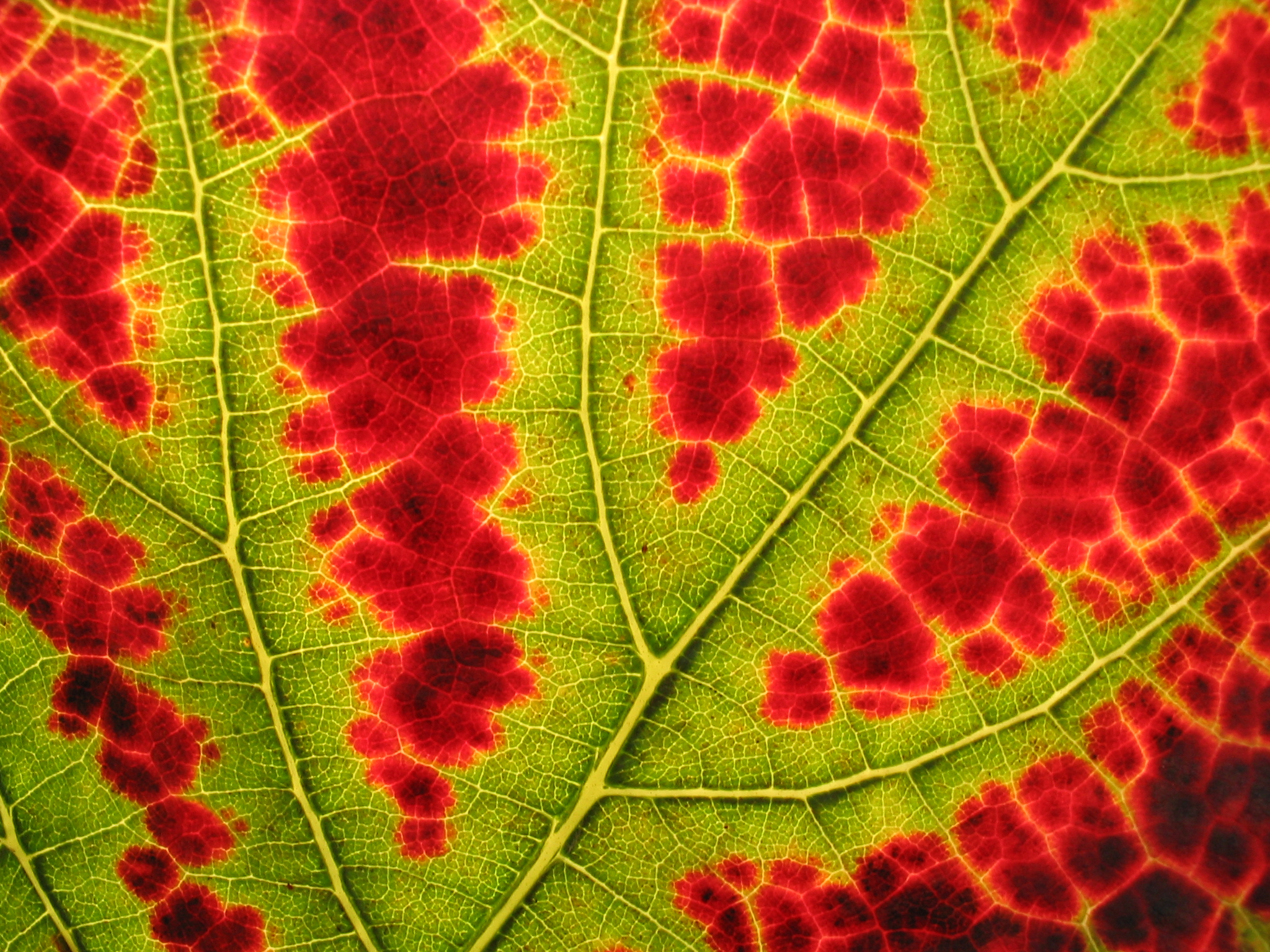
In this leaf, the veins are still green, while the other tissue is turning red. This produces a fractal-like pattern

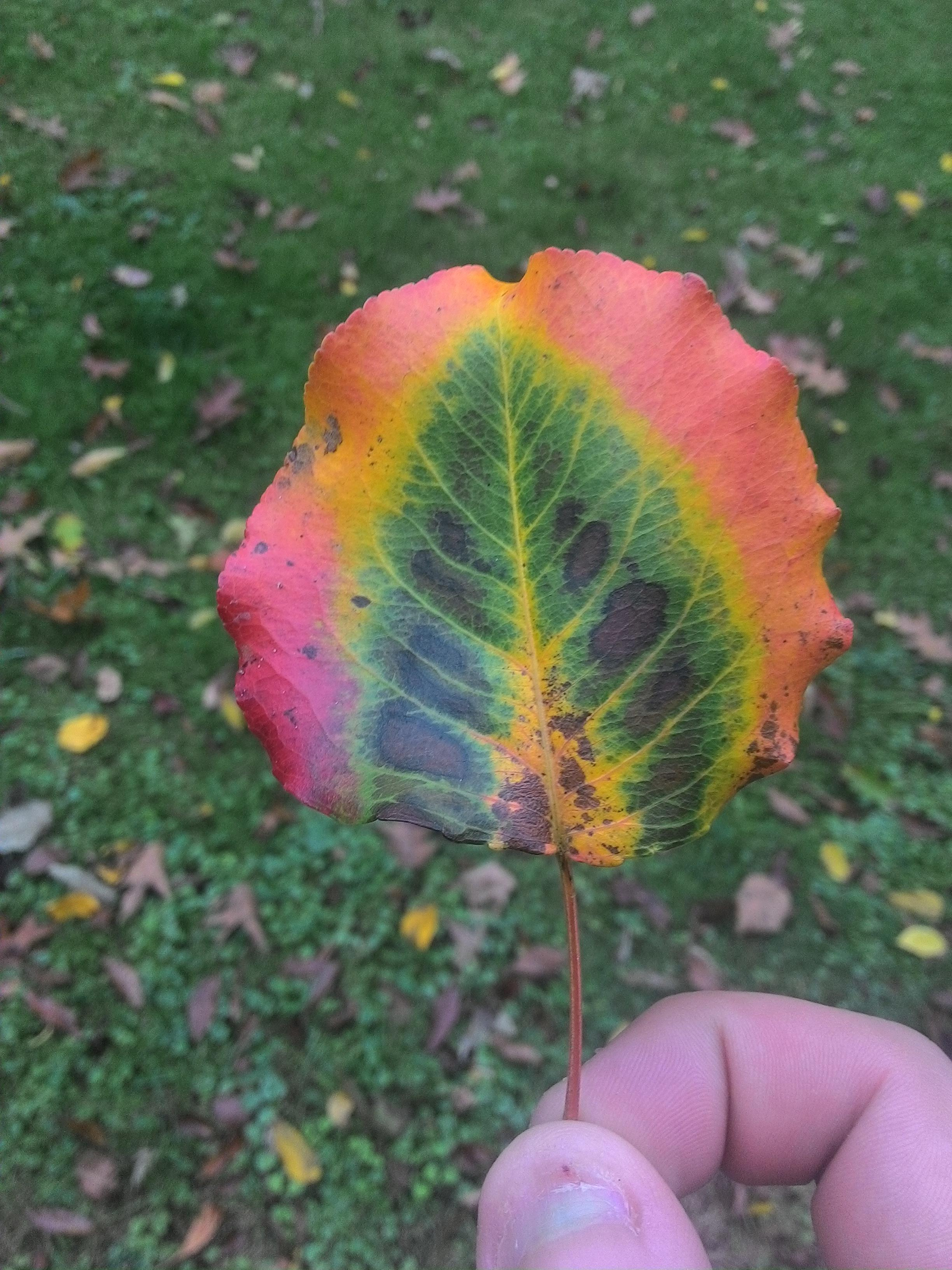
A North American leaf with multiple colors across it

Cross-section of a leaf showing color changes

A green leaf is green because of the presence of a pigment known as chlorophyll, which is inside an organelle called a chloroplast. When abundant in the leaf's cells, as during the growing season, the chlorophyll's green color dominates and masks out the colors of any other pigments that may be present in the leaf. Thus, the leaves of summer are characteristically green.

Chlorophyll has a vital function: it captures solar rays and uses the resulting energy in the manufacture of the plant's food – simple sugars which are produced from water and carbon dioxide. These sugars are the basis of the plant's nourishment – the sole source of the carbohydrates needed for growth and development. In their food-manufacturing process, the chlorophylls occasionally break down due to processes such as photobleaching. During the growing season, however, the plant replenishes the chlorophyll so that the supply remains high and the leaves stay green.

In late summer, with daylight hours shortening and temperatures cooling, leaf senescence kicks in and the plant begins recovering its nutritional investment into the leaves. Chlorophyll is located in the thylakoid membrane of the chloroplast, as part of the light-harvesting complex II (LHC II). The LHC II is composed of an apoprotein along with several ligands, the most important of which are chlorophylls a and b. In the autumn, this complex is broken down. Chlorophyll degradation is thought to occur first. Research suggests that the beginning of chlorophyll degradation is catalyzed by chlorophyll b reductase, which reduces chlorophyll b to 7‑hydroxymethyl chlorophyll a, which is then reduced to chlorophyll a. This is believed to destabilize the complex, at which point breakdown of the apoprotein occurs. An important enzyme in the breakdown of the apoprotein is FtsH6, which belongs to the FtsH family of proteases. Other parts of the chloroplasts such as RubisCO are similarly broken down and scrapped for parts.

Another process that happens in autumn is the abscission (dropping) of leaves, which cuts them off from the plant and causes them to fall off. During abscission, the veins that carry fluids into and out of the leaf are gradually closed off as a layer of special cork cells forms at the base of each leaf. As this cork layer (abscission layer) develops, water and mineral intake into the leaf is reduced, slowly at first, and then more rapidly. Different types of deciduous plants time the two processes differently: some senesce slowly, maintaining chlorophyll and performing photosynthesis up to the point the leaf is fully cut off (abscission zone competency); others fully senesce before the full formation of cork. The semi-deciduous does both slowly. The marcescent completely senesces, but does not abcise.

Often, the veins are still green after the tissues between them have almost completely changed color.

=== Carotenoids ===
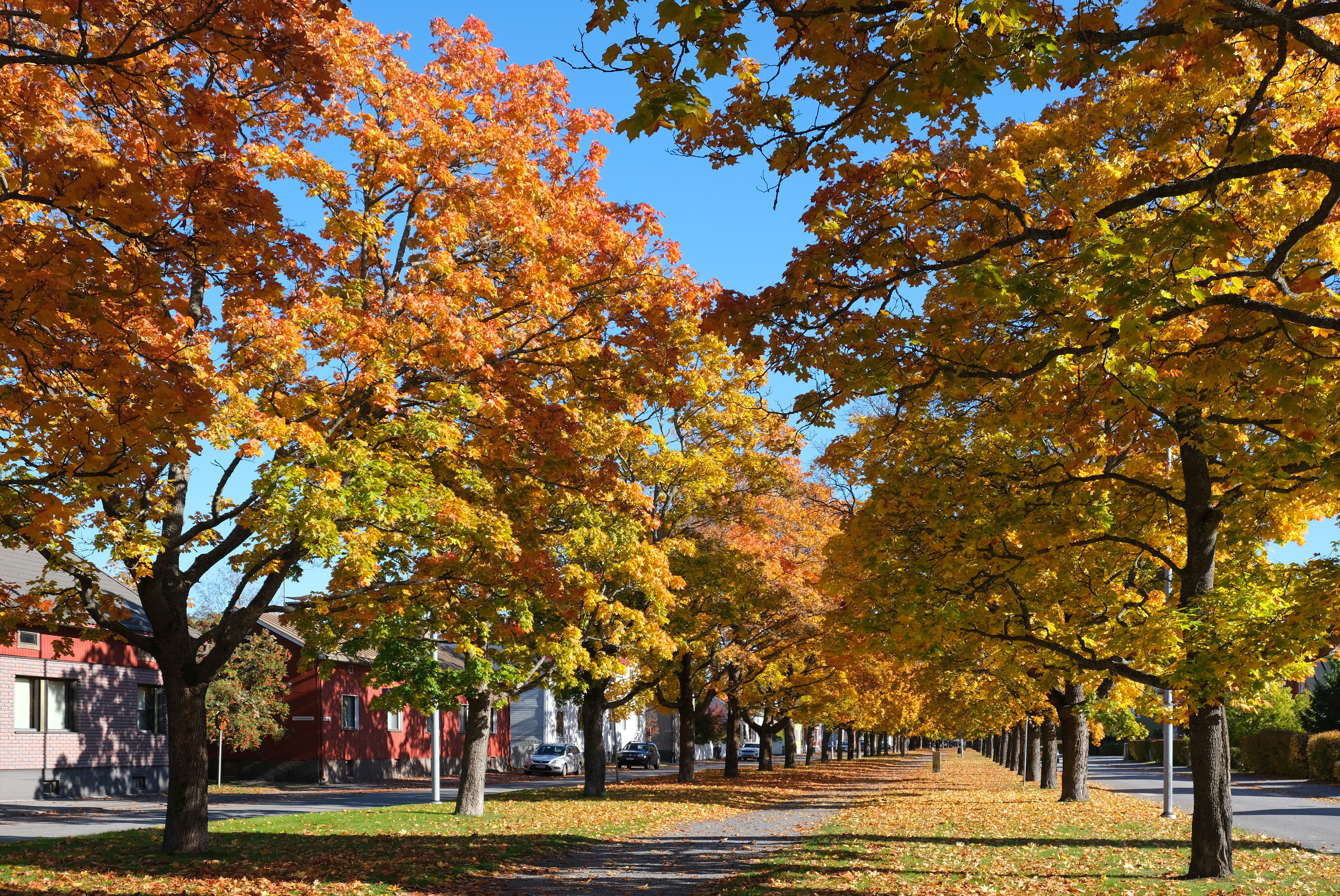
Autumn coloration at the Kalevanpuisto park in Pori, Finland.

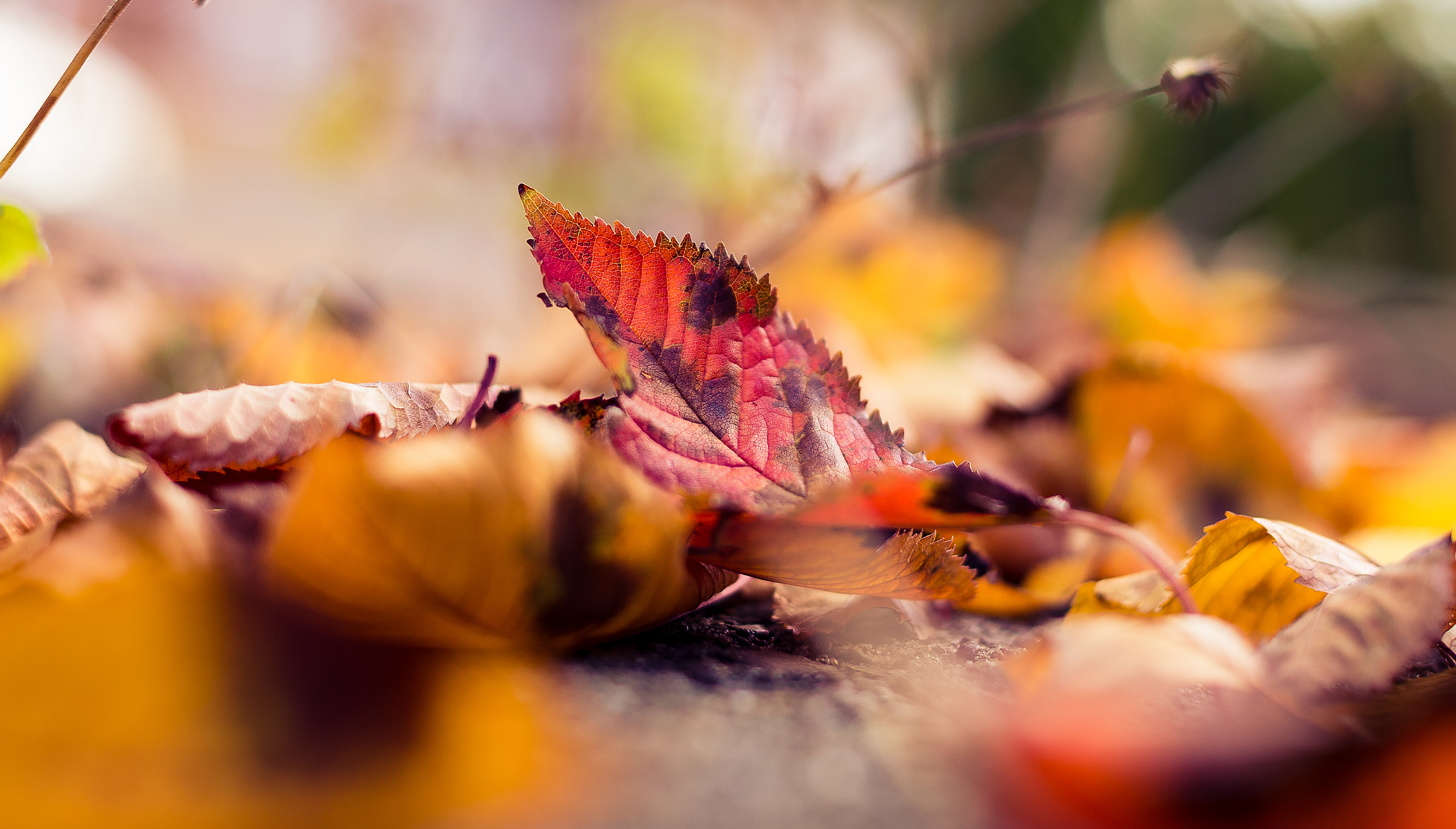
Fallen autumn leaves in England

Carotenoids are present in the leaves throughout the year, but their orange-yellow colors are usually masked by green chlorophyll. As autumn approaches, certain influences both inside and outside the plant cause the chlorophylls to be replaced at a slower rate than they are being used up. During this period, with the total supply of chlorophylls gradually dwindling, the "masking" effect slowly fades away. Then other pigments present (along with the chlorophylls) in the leaf's cells begin to show through. These are carotenoids and they provide colorations of yellow, brown, orange, and the many hues in between.

The carotenoids occur, along with the chlorophyll pigments, in tiny structures called plastids, within the cells of leaves. Sometimes, they are in such abundance in the leaf that they give a plant a yellow-green color, even during the summer. Usually, however, they become prominent for the first time in autumn, when the leaves begin to lose their chlorophyll.

Carotenoids are common in many living things, giving characteristic color to carrots, corn, canaries, and daffodils, as well as egg yolks, rutabagas, buttercups, and bananas.

Their brilliant yellows and oranges tint the leaves of such hardwood species as hickories, ash, maple, yellow poplar, aspen, birch, black cherry, sycamore, cottonwood, sassafras, and alder. Carotenoids are the dominant pigment in coloration of about 15–30% of tree species.

=== Anthocyanins ===
The reds, the purples, the pinks, and their blended combinations that decorate autumn foliage come from another group of pigments in the cells called anthocyanins. Unlike the carotenoids, these pigments are not present in the leaf throughout the growing season, but are actively produced towards the end of summer. They develop in late summer in the sap of the cells of the leaf, and this development is the result of complex interactions of many influences both inside and outside the plant. Their formation depends on the breakdown of sugars in the presence of bright light as the level of phosphate in the leaf is reduced.

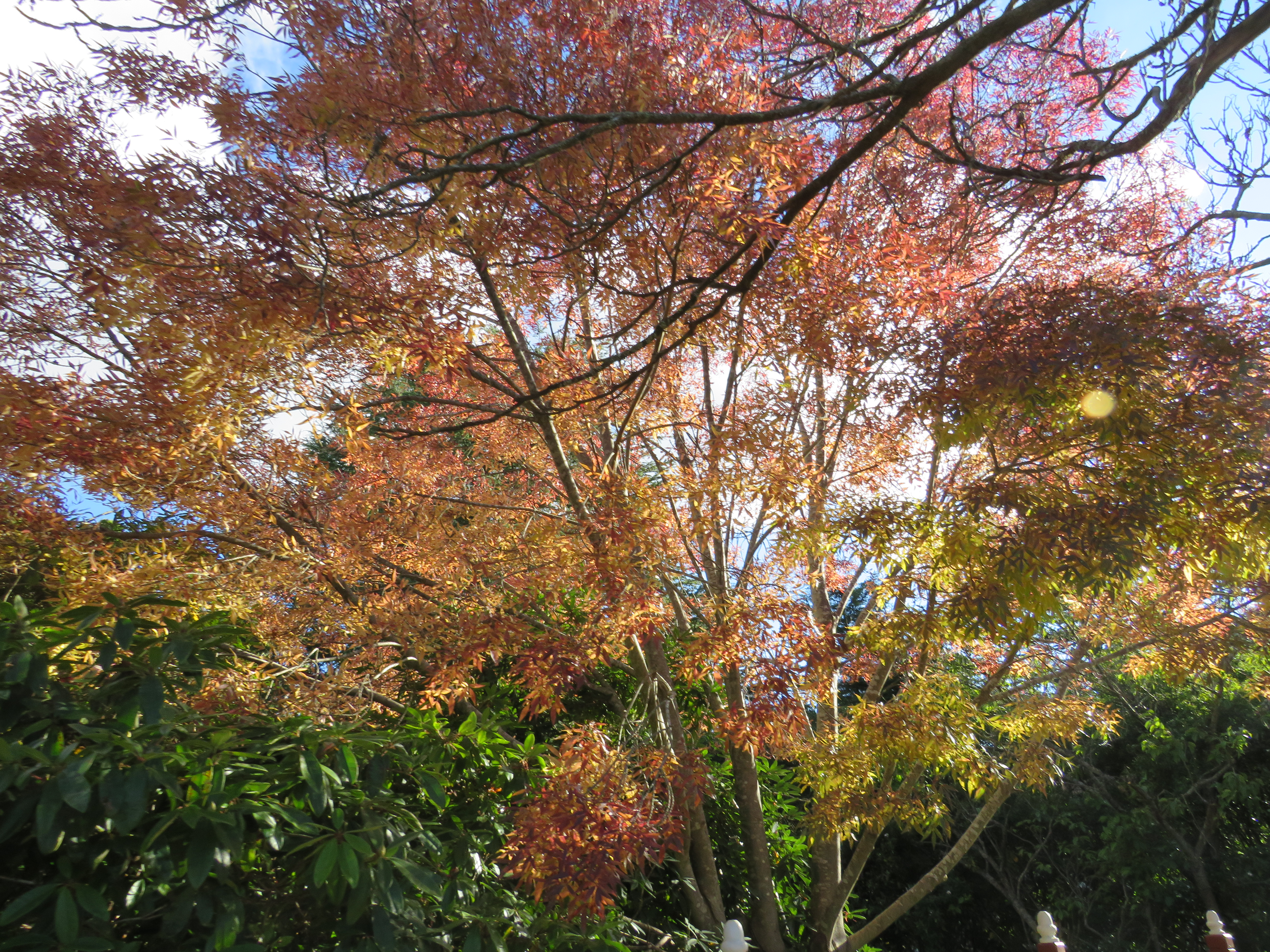
Autumn foliage at Blue Mountains, Australia in April 2022

During the summer growing season, phosphate is at a high level. It has a vital role in the breakdown of the sugars manufactured by chlorophyll, but in autumn, phosphate, along with the other chemicals and nutrients, moves out of the leaf into the stem of the plant. When this happens, the sugar-breakdown process changes, leading to the production of anthocyanin pigments. The brighter the light during this period, the greater the production of anthocyanins and the more brilliant the resulting color display. When the days of autumn are bright and cool, and the nights are chilly but not freezing, the brightest colorations usually develop.

Anthocyanins temporarily color the edges of some of the very young leaves as they unfold from the buds in early spring. They also give the familiar color to such common fruits as cranberries, red apples, blueberries, cherries, strawberries, and plums.

Anthocyanins are present in about 10% of tree species in temperate regions, although in certain – most famously northern New England – up to 70% of tree species may produce the pigment. In autumn forests, they appear vivid in the maples, oaks, sourwood, sweetgums, dogwoods, tupelos, cherry trees, and persimmons. These same pigments often combine with the carotenoids' colors to create the deeper orange, fiery reds, and bronzes typical of many hardwood species.

== Function of autumn colors ==
Deciduous plants were traditionally believed to shed their leaves in autumn primarily because the high costs involved in their maintenance would outweigh the benefits from photosynthesis during the winter period of low light availability and cold temperatures. In many cases, this turned out to be oversimplistic – other factors involved include insect predation, water loss, and damage from high winds or snowfall.

Anthocyanins, responsible for red-purple coloration, are actively produced in autumn, but not involved in leaf-drop. A number of hypotheses on the role of pigment production in leaf-drop have been proposed, and generally fall into two categories: interaction with animals, and protection from nonbiological factors.

=== Photoprotection ===
According to the photoprotection theory, anthocyanins protect the leaf against the harmful effects of light at low temperatures. The leaves are about to fall, so protection is not of extreme importance for the tree. Photo-oxidation and photoinhibition, however, especially at low temperatures, make the process of reabsorbing nutrients less efficient. By shielding the leaf with anthocyanins, according to photoprotection theory, the tree manages to reabsorb nutrients (especially nitrogen) more efficiently.

=== Coevolution ===
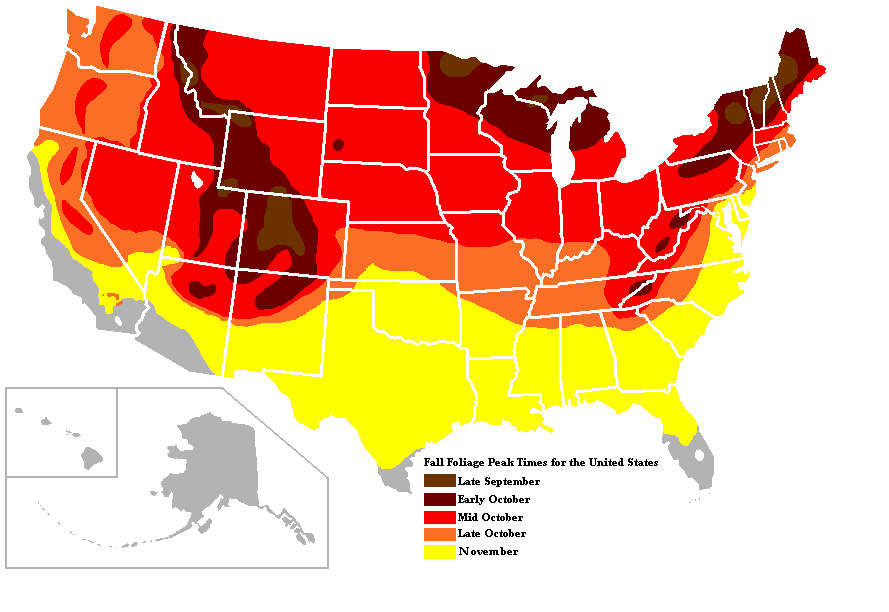
Fall foliage peak times in the United States

According to the coevolution theory, the colors are warning signals to insects like aphids that use trees as a host for the winter. If the colors are linked to the amount of chemical defenses against insects, then the insects will avoid red leaves and increase their fitness; at the same time, trees with red leaves have an advantage because they reduce their parasite load. This has been shown in the case of apple trees where some domesticated apple varieties, unlike wild ones, lack red leaves in the autumn. A greater proportion of aphids that avoid apple trees with red leaves manage to grow and develop compared to those that do not. A trade-off, moreover, exists between fruit size, leaf color, and aphids resistance as varieties with red leaves have smaller fruits, suggesting a cost to the production of red leaves linked to a greater need for reduced aphid infestation.

Consistently with red-leaved trees providing reduced survival for aphids, tree species with bright leaves tend to select for more specialist aphid pests than do trees lacking bright leaves (autumn colors are useful only in those species coevolving with insect pests in autumn). One study found that simulating insect herbivory (leaf-eating damage) on maple trees showed earlier red coloration than trees that were not damaged.

The coevolution theory of autumn colors was proposed by W. D. Hamilton in 2001 as an example of evolutionary signalling theory. (Note: Hamilton died in 2000. The paper was submitted by coauthor S.P. Brown in December of the same year and published in 2001.) With biological signals such as red leaves, it is argued that because they are costly to produce, they are usually honest vouchers for the true quality of the signaler, whereas "low-quality" individuals are unable to fake them and cheat. Autumn colors would be a signal if they were costly to produce, or be impossible to fake (for example if autumn pigments were produced by the same biochemical pathway that produces the chemical defenses against the insects).

The changing leaf colors prior to the fall have also been suggested as adaptations that may help to undermine the camouflage of herbivores.

Many plants with berries attract birds with especially visible berry and/or leaf color, particularly bright red. The birds get a meal, while the shrub, vine, or typically small tree gets undigested seeds carried off and deposited with the birds' manure. Poison ivy is particularly notable for having bright-red foliage drawing birds to its off-white seeds (which are edible for birds, but not most mammals).

=== Allelopathy ===
The brilliant red autumn color of some species of maple is created by processes separate from those in chlorophyll breakdown. When the tree is struggling to cope with the energy demands of a changing and challenging season, maple trees are involved in an additional metabolic expenditure to create anthocyanins. These anthocyanins, which create the visual red hues, have been found to aid in interspecific competition by stunting the growth of nearby saplings (allelopathy).

== Tourism ==
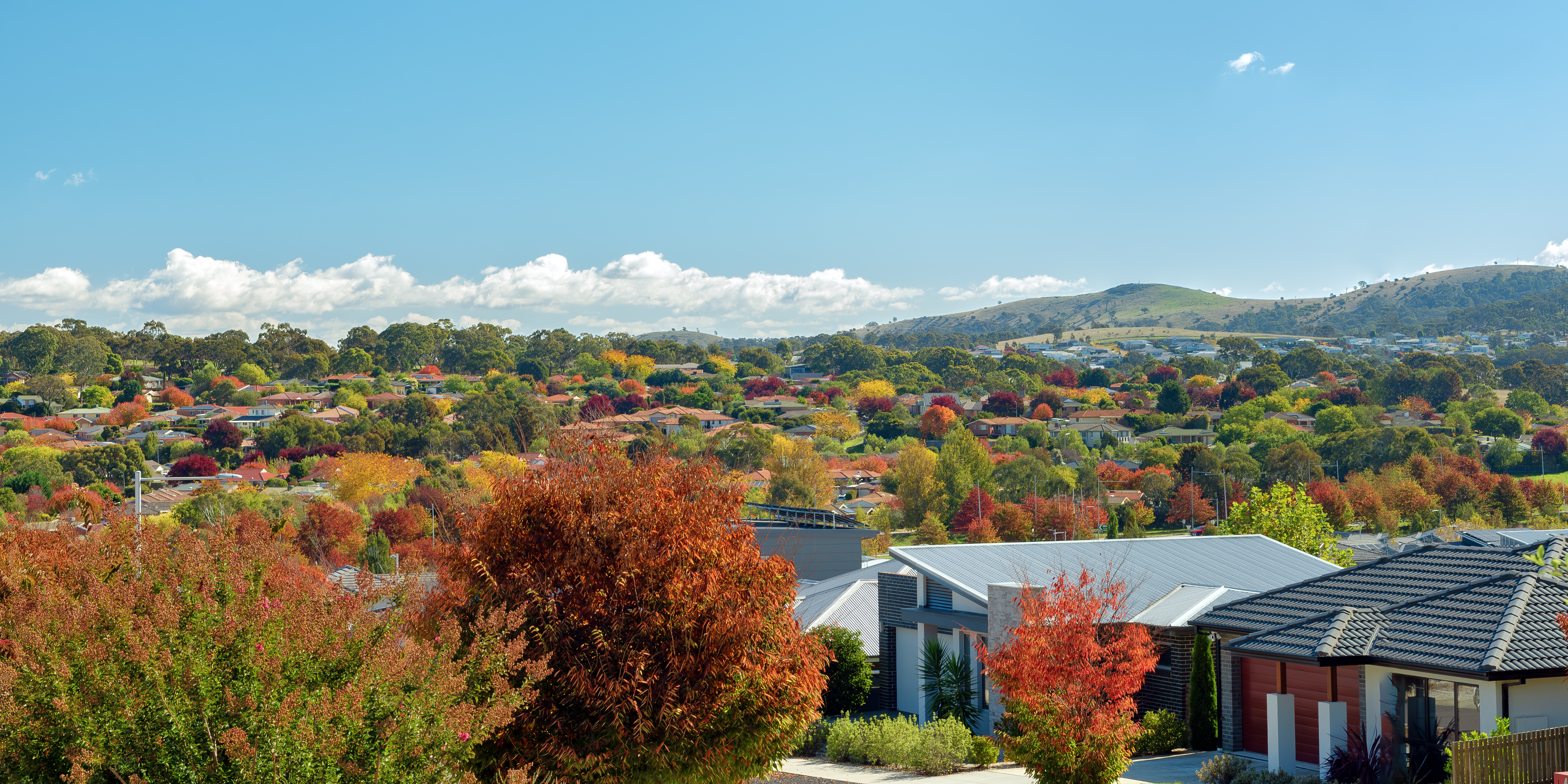
Autumn in Canberra, Australia

Although some autumn coloration occurs wherever deciduous trees are found, the most brightly colored autumn foliage is found in the northern hemisphere, including most of southern mainland Canada, some areas of the northern United States, Northern and Western Europe, Northern Italy, the Caucasus region of Russia near the Black Sea, and Eastern Asia (including much of northern and eastern China, and as well as Korea and Japan).

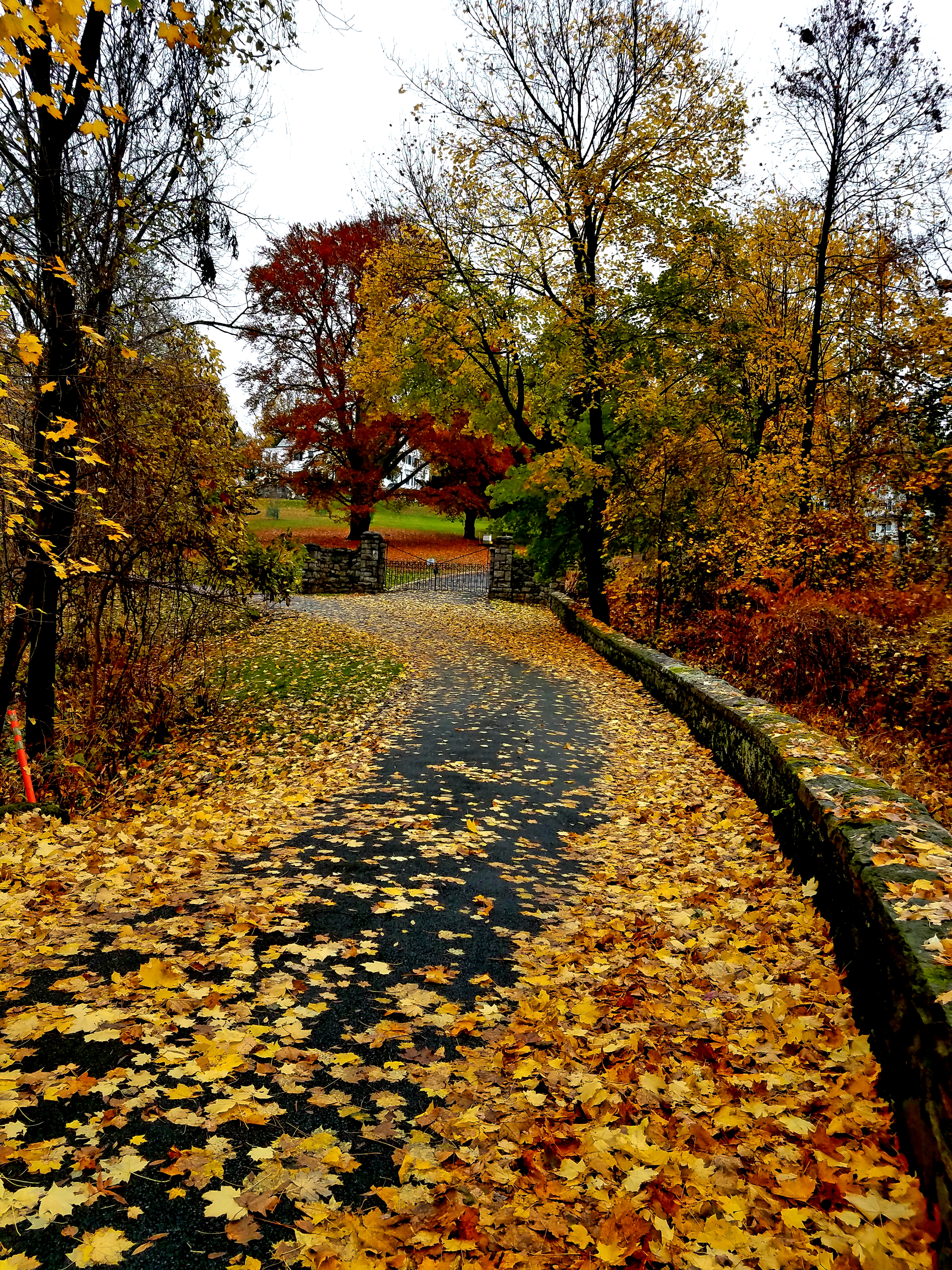
Old Croton Aqueduct State Historic Park in Westchester County, New York, in early November

In the southern hemisphere, colorful autumn foliage can be observed in southern and central Argentina, the south and southeast regions of Brazil, eastern and southeastern Australia (including South Australia and Tasmania) and most of New Zealand, particularly the South Island.

== Climate influences ==
Compared to Western Europe (excluding Southern Europe), North America provides many more tree species (more than 800 species and about 70 oaks, compared to 51 and three, respectively, in Western Europe) which adds many more different colors to the spectacle. The main reason is the different effect of the Ice ages – while in North America, species were protected in more southern regions along north–south ranging mountains, this was not the case in much of Europe.

Global warming and rising carbon dioxide levels in the atmosphere may delay the usual autumn spectacle of changing colors and falling leaves in northern hardwood forests in the future, and increase forest productivity. Specifically, higher autumn temperatures in the Northeastern United States is delaying the color change. Experiments with poplar trees showed that they stayed greener longer with higher CO_{2} levels, independent of temperature changes. However, the experiments over two years were too brief to indicate how mature forests may be affected over time. Other studies using 150 years of herbarium specimens found more than a one-month delay in the onset of autumn since the 19th century, and found that insect, viral, and drought stress can also affect the timing of fall coloration in maple trees. Also, other factors, such as increasing ozone levels close to the ground (tropospheric ozone pollution), can negate the beneficial effects of elevated carbon dioxide.

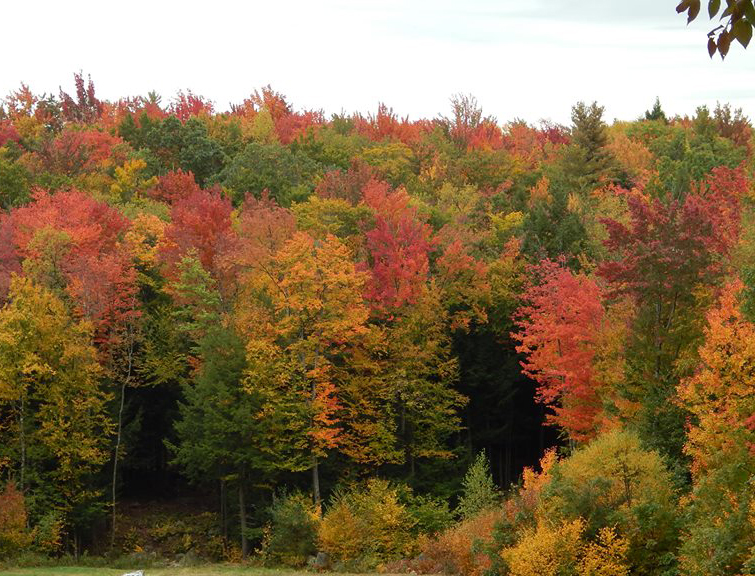
Typical fall foliage in red maple country, in the Adirondack Mountains of Upstate New York

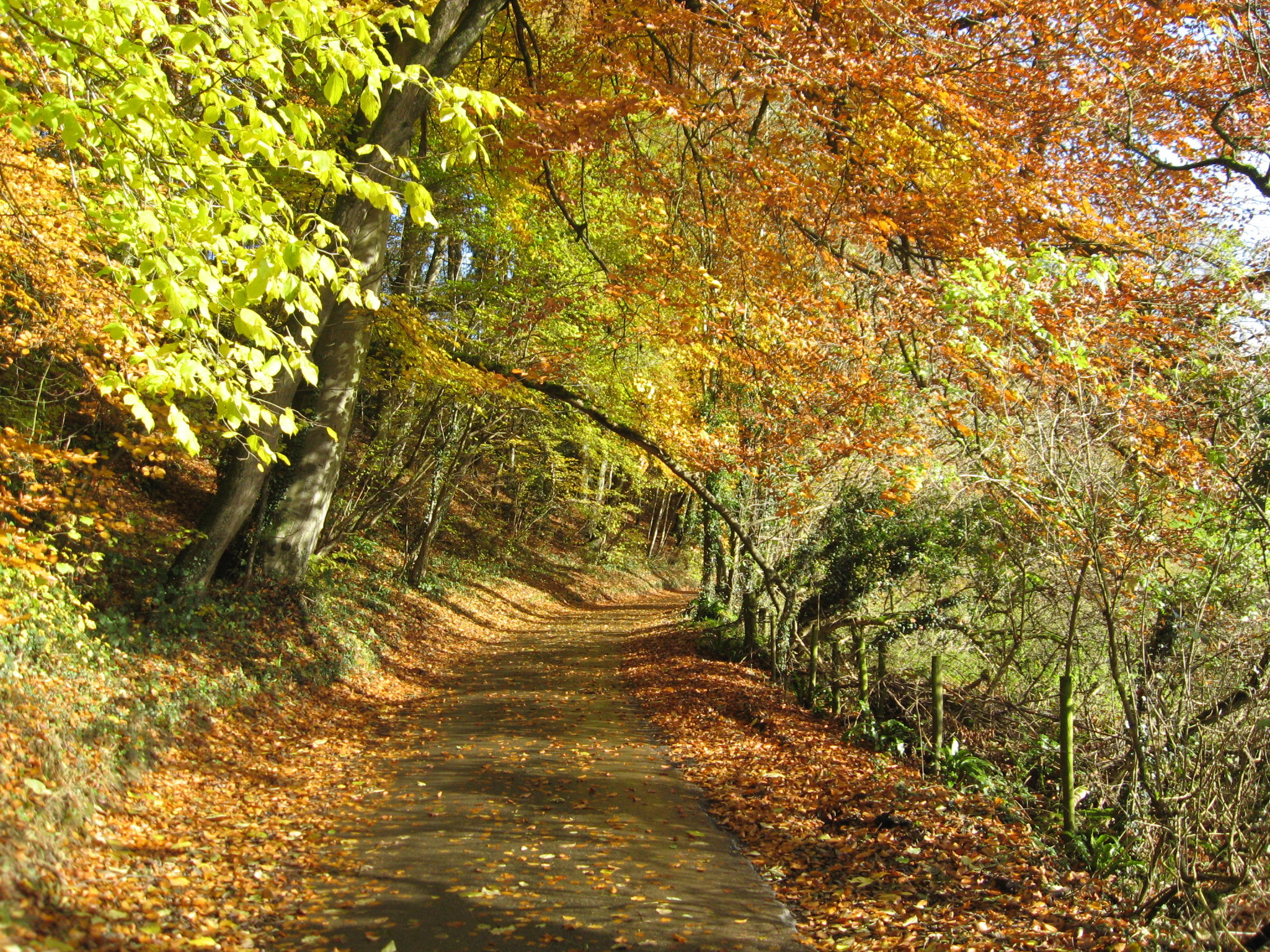
English country lane in the autumn

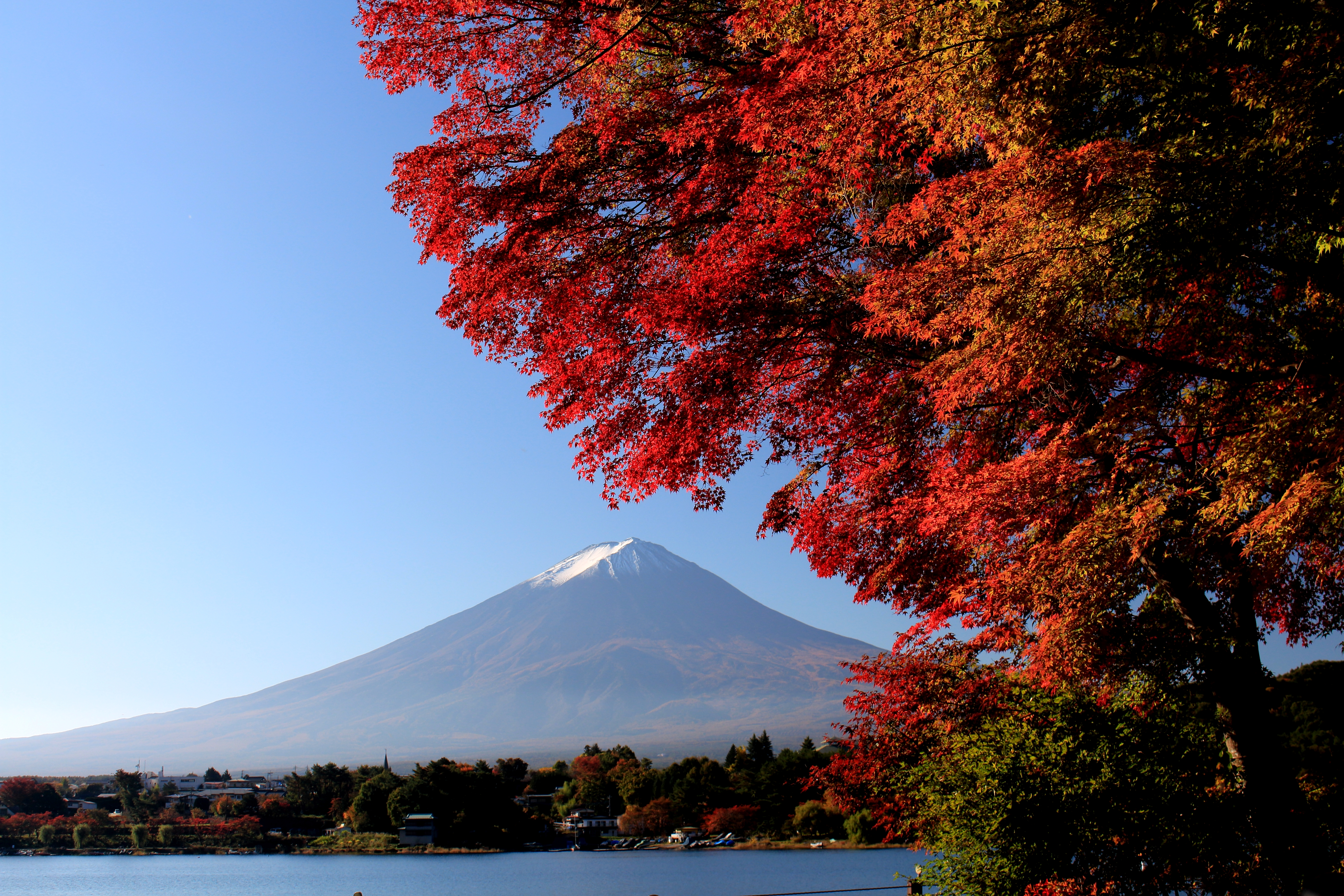
Autumn leaf color and Mount Fuji with snow seen from Lake Kawaguchi, Japan.

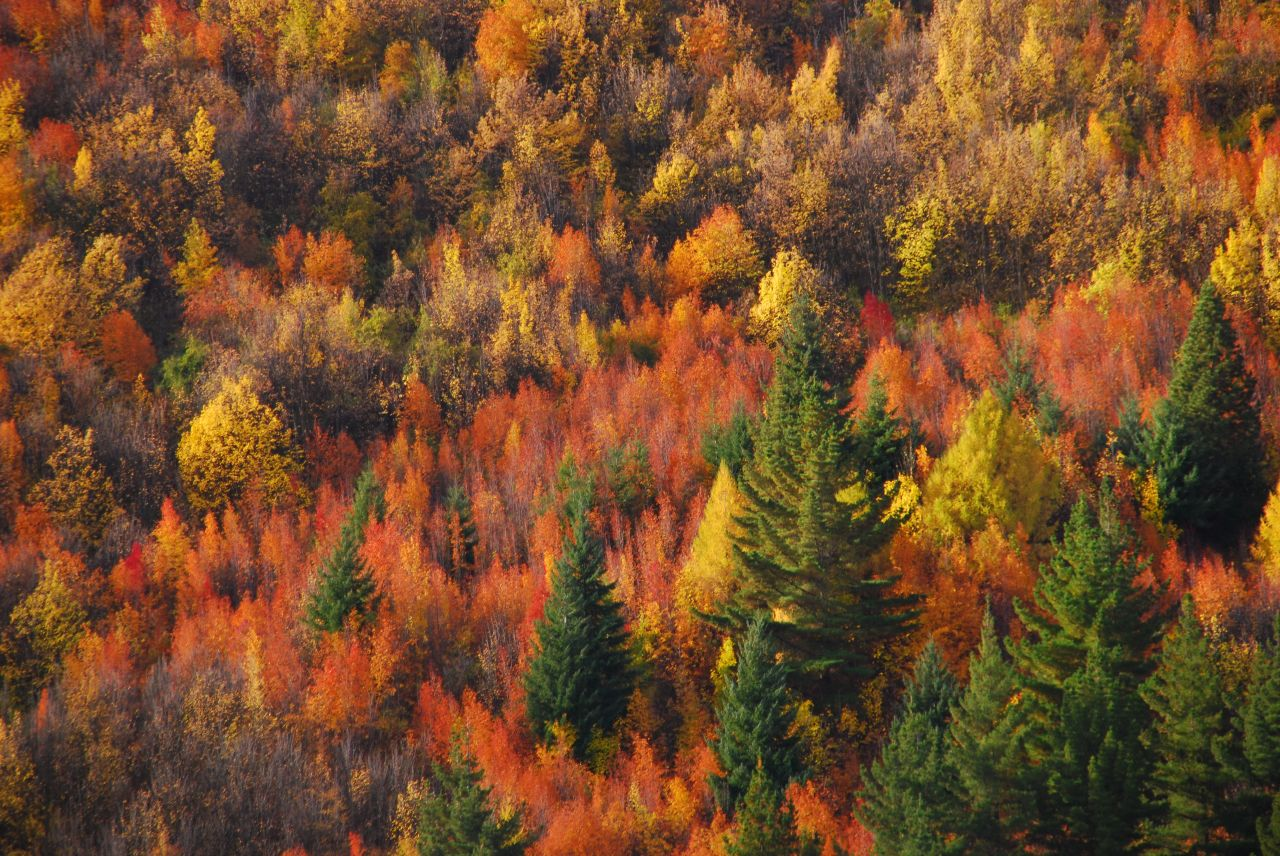
Autumn in Arrowtown, New Zealand.

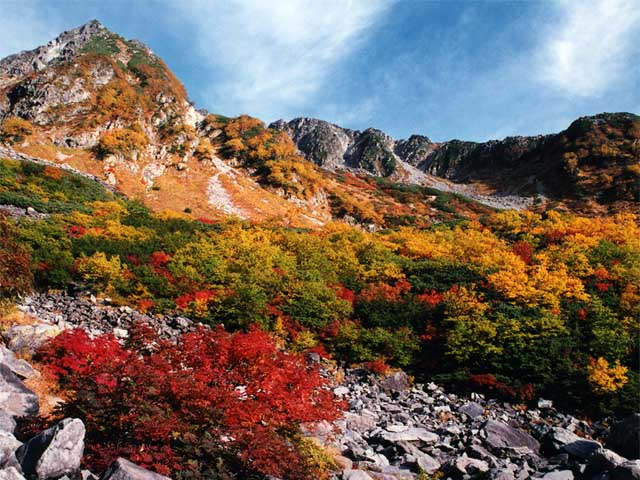
Autumn coloration at Karasawa of the Hodaka Mountains in Japan

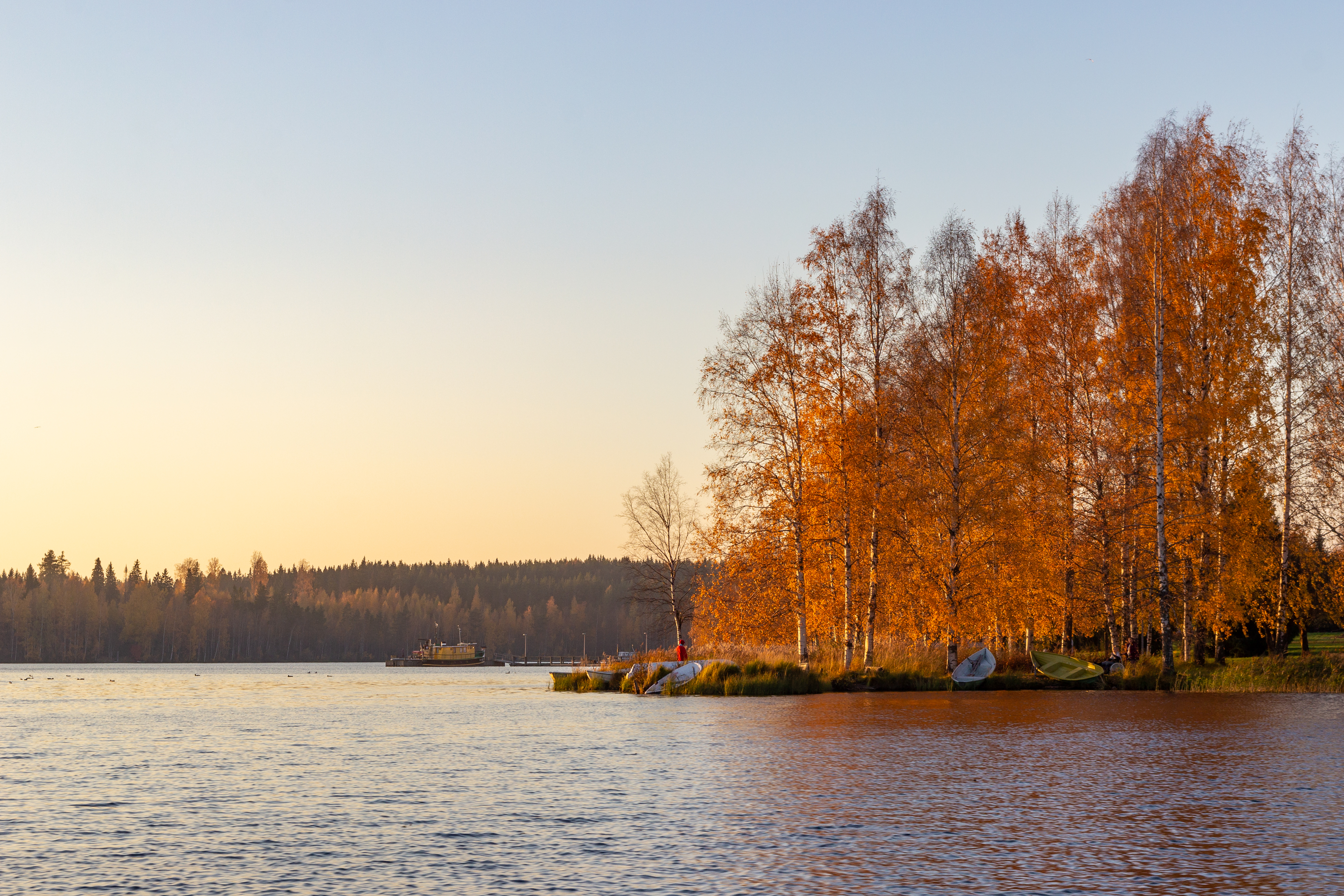
Autumn orange colors in Heinola, Finland, in October 2018

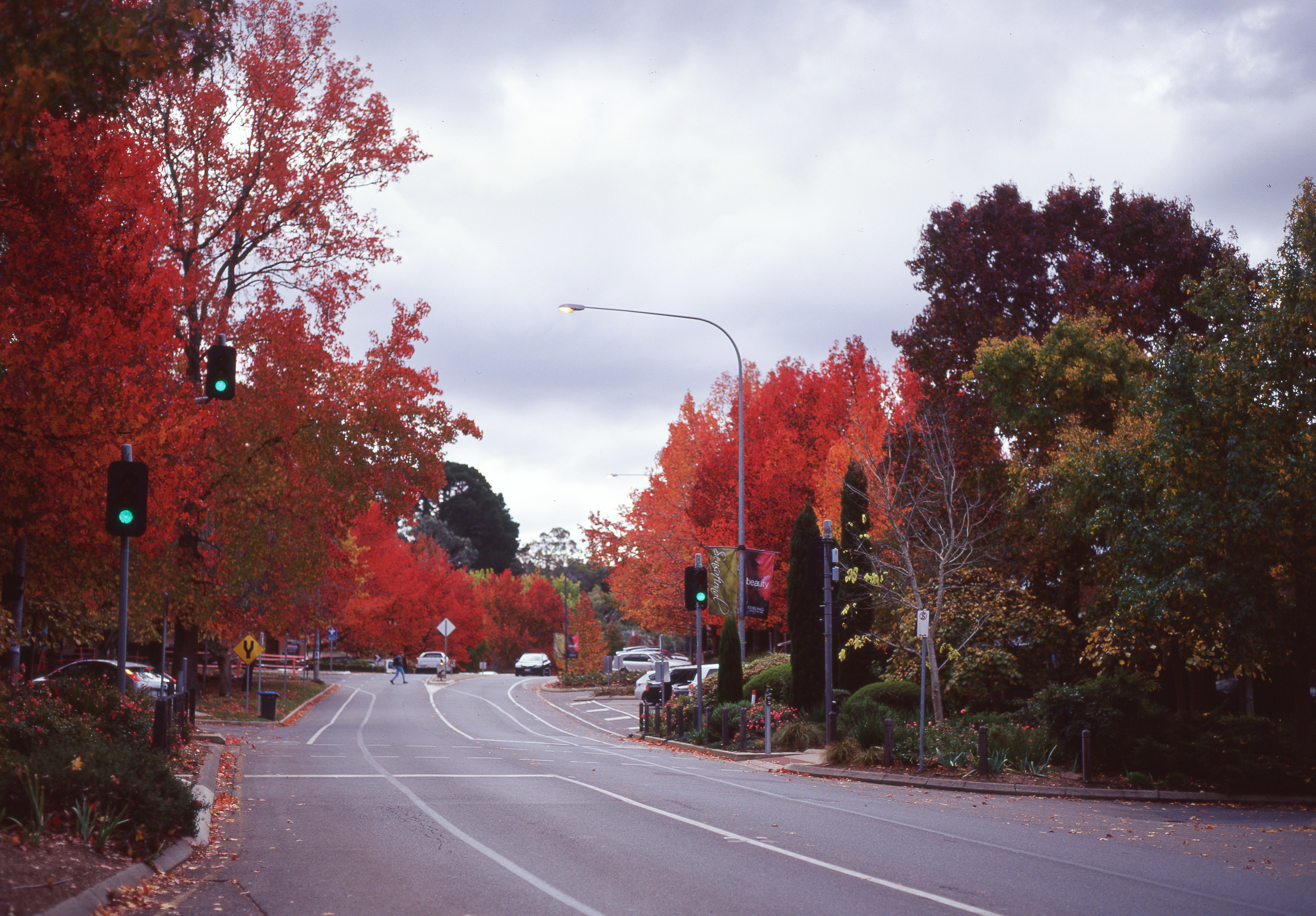
The town of Stirling, South Australia, located in the Adelaide Hills, attracts many tourists during autumn.

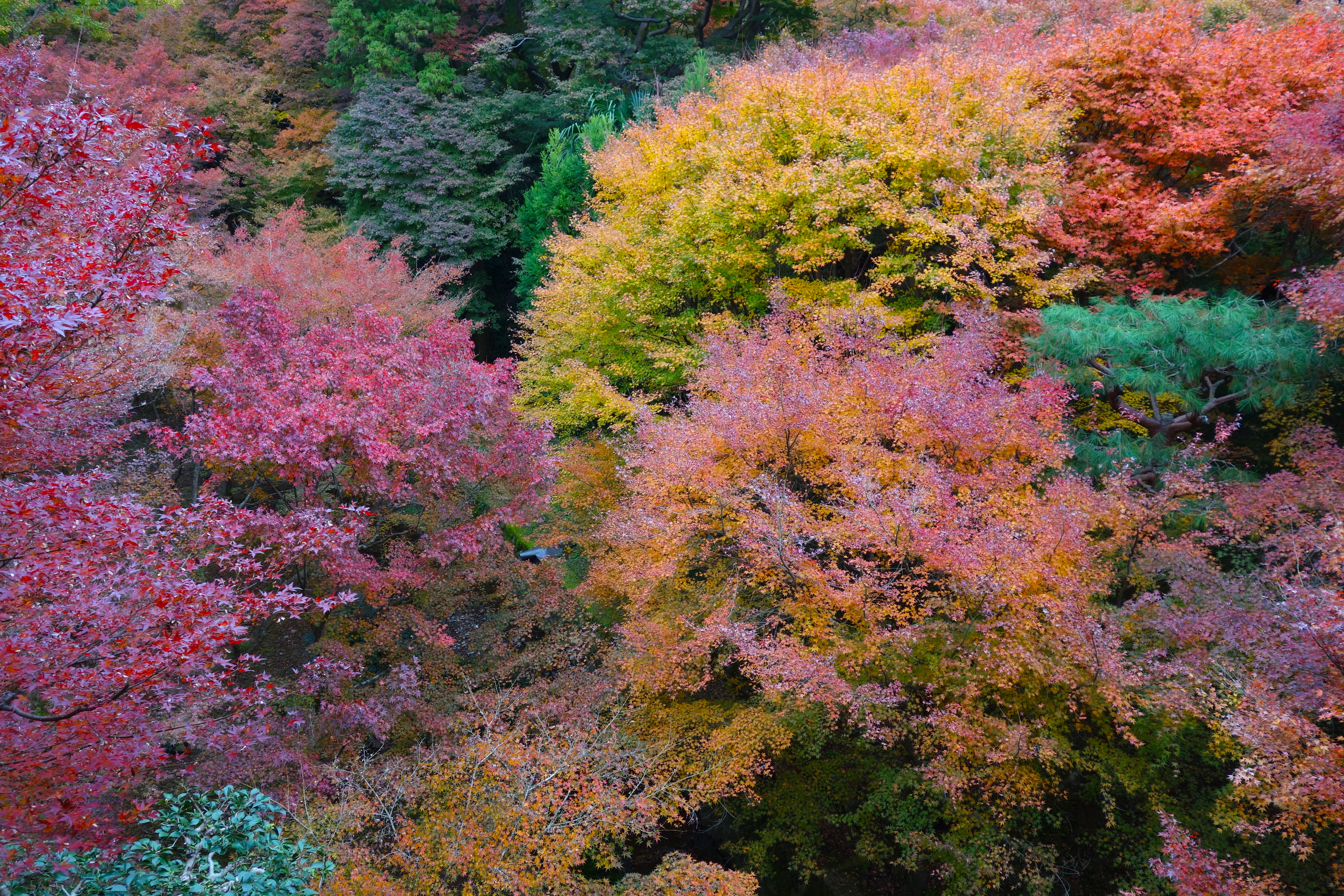
A variety of colors around Tōfuku-ji temple in Kyoto, Japan

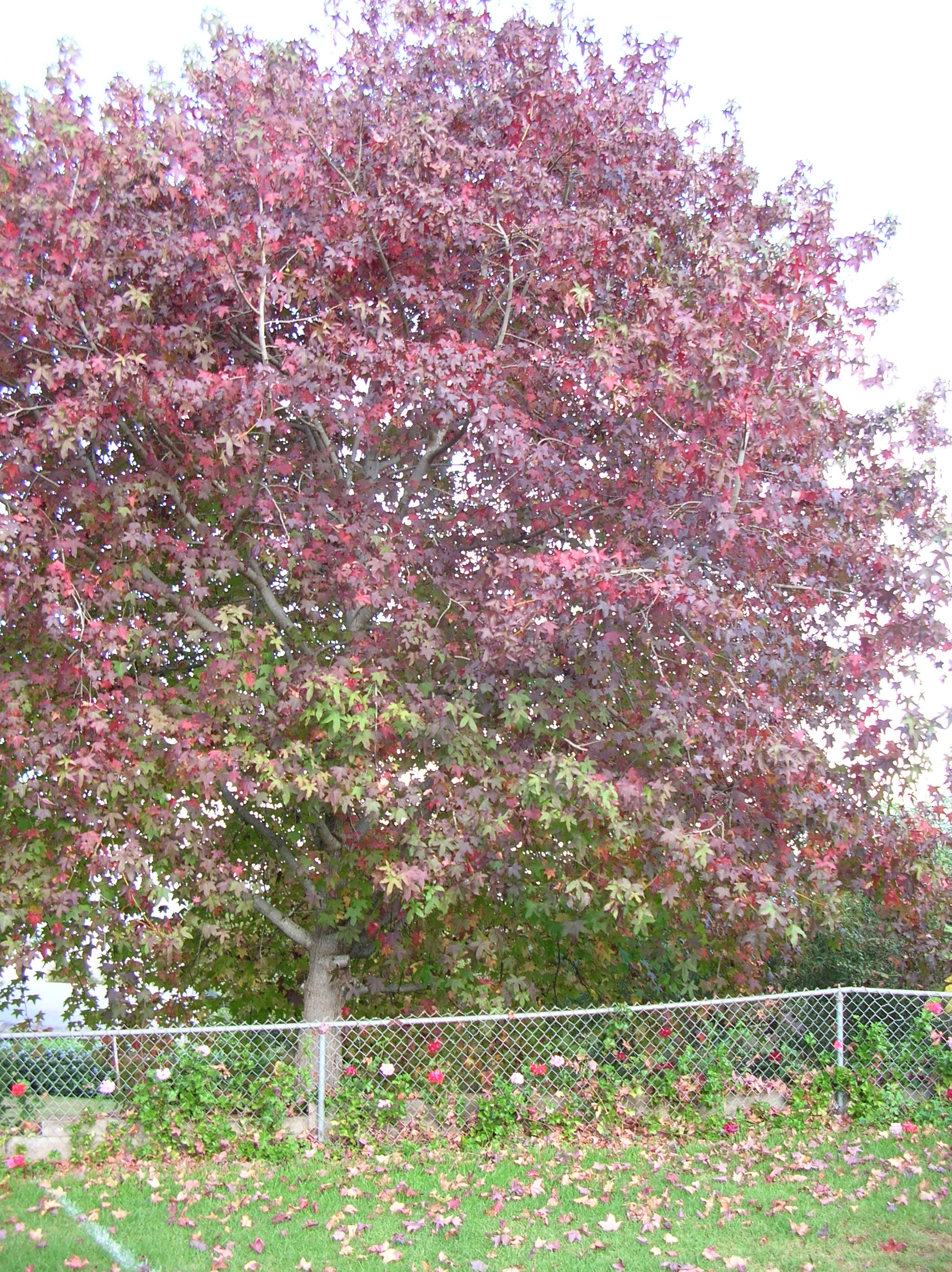
Some trees, such as this American sweetgum at Keokea, Maui, develop bold fall colors in subtropical or tropical areas.

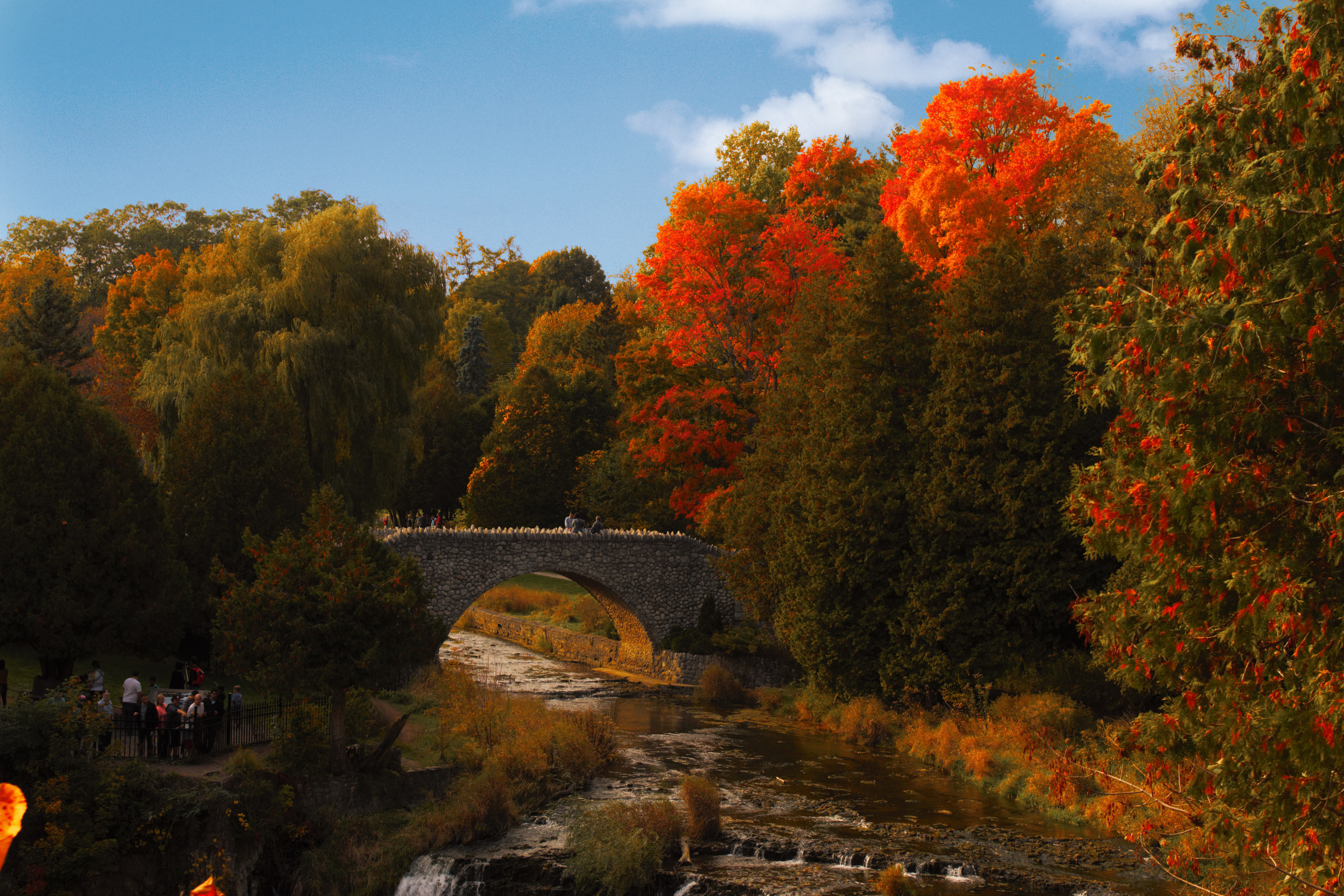
Webster's Falls, Ontario, Canada
