= Inbound tourism to Japan =

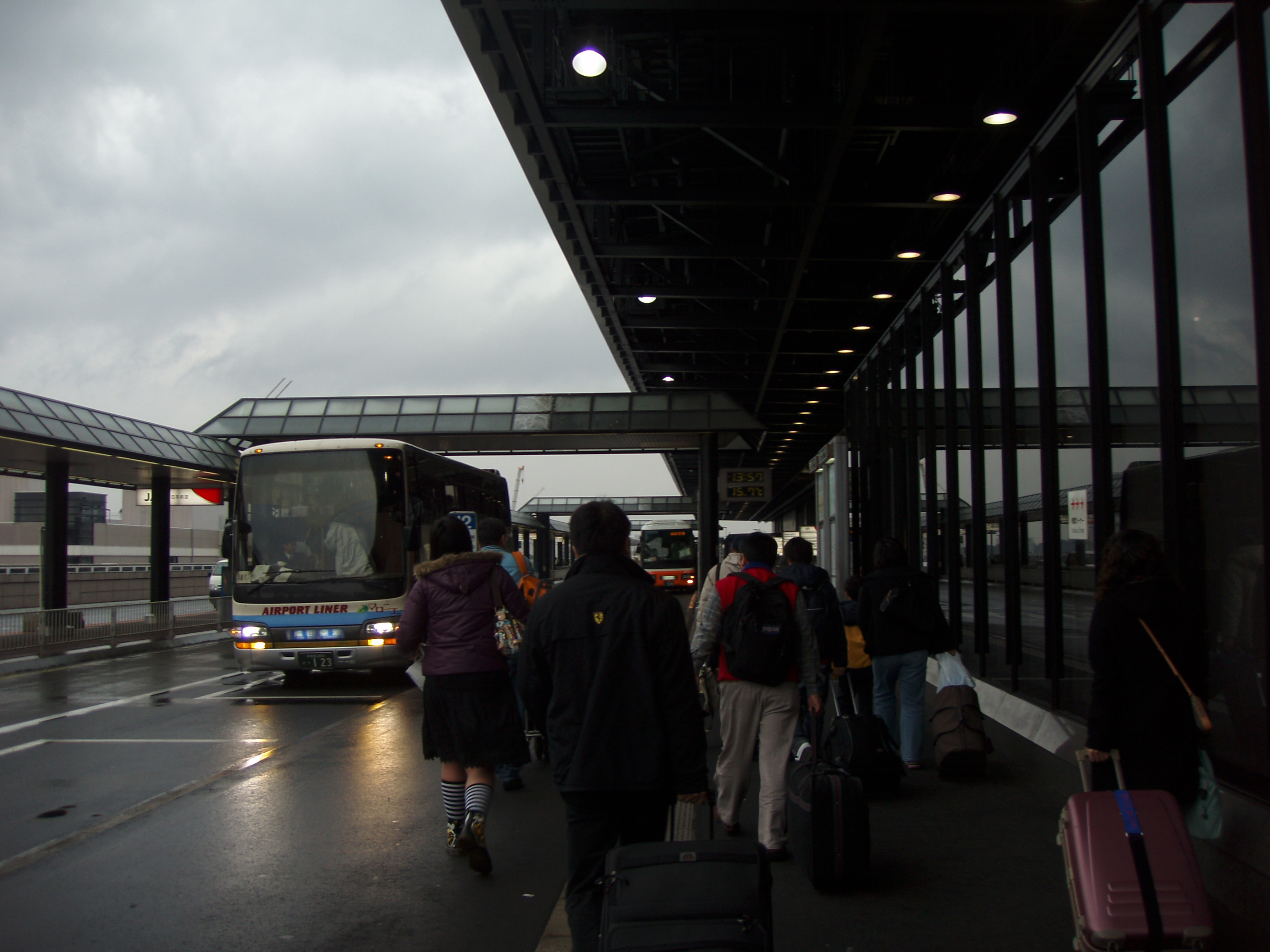
Tourists at Narita Airport

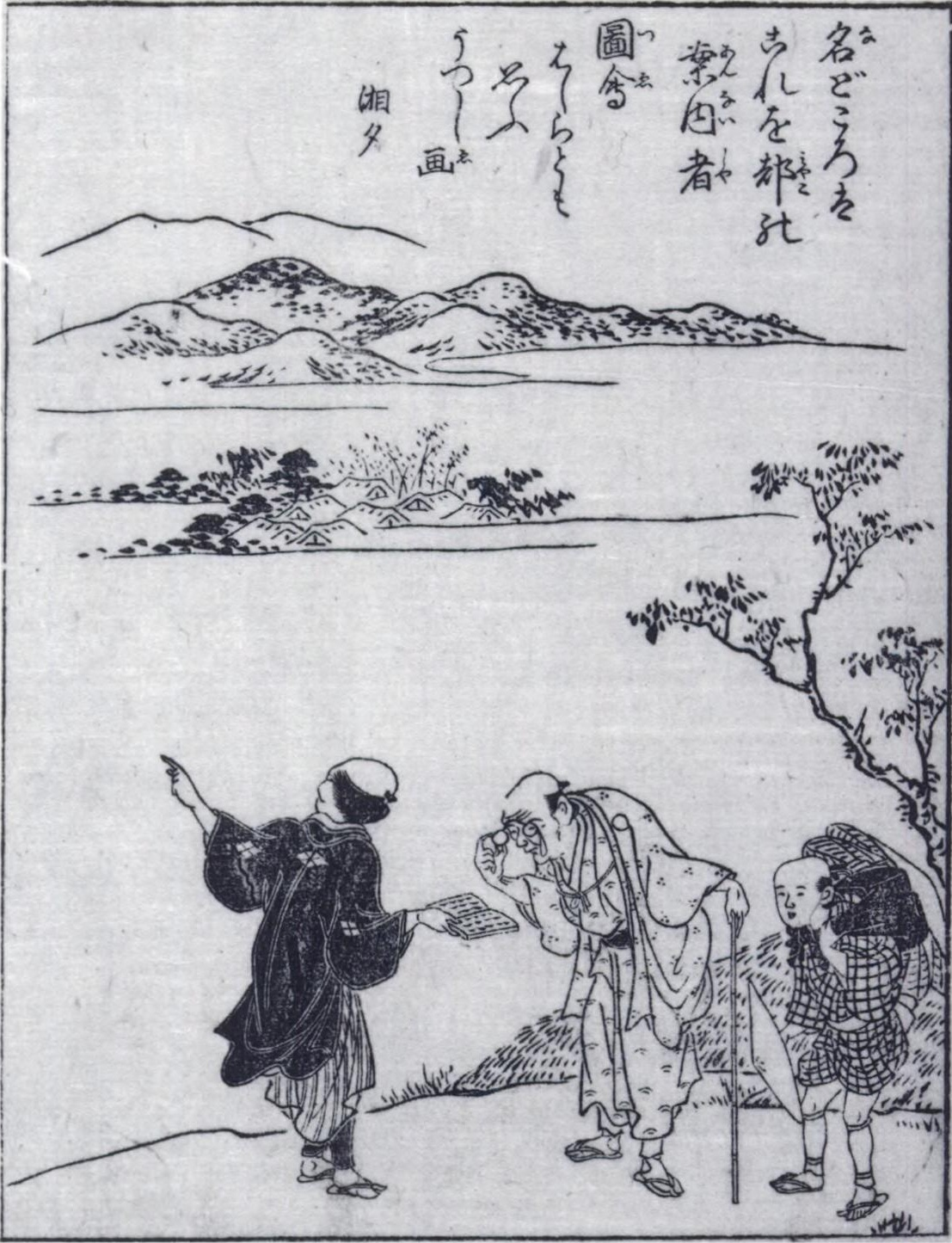
A Japanese tourist consulting a tour guide and a guide book from Akizato Ritō's Miyako meisho zue (1787)

Inbound tourism to Japan (Japanese: 訪日外国人旅行, Hepburn: Hōnichi Gaikokujin Ryokō) refers to travelers visiting Japan from abroad. This article covers its overall trends, impact on Japan's economy and society, and challenges involved.

== Number of inbound tourists to Japan ==
The number of inbound travelers to Japan steadily increased from approximately 4.8 million in 2000, 6.7 million in 2005, to 8.6 million in 2010. However, in 2011, the number dropped significantly to around 6.2 million due to the Great East Japan Earthquake and the subsequent Fukushima Daiichi Nuclear Power Plant incident.

However, because of relaxed visa requirements by the Japanese government to attract foreign tourists and the trend of the yen depreciation started at the end of 2012, the number of foreign visitors has significantly increased. In 2013, it exceeded 10 million for the first time, and in 2015, it reached almost 20 million, surpassing the number of Japanese travelers going abroad for the first time in 45 years. In 2019, inbound foreign visitors reached about 32 million, with a total spending of 4.8 trillion yen (about US$32 billion), both recording all-time highs.

By nationality and region, more than 70% of inbound tourists come from the People's Republic of China (China), the Republic of China (Taiwan), the Republic of Korea (South Korea), and Hong Kong.

== Initiatives by the Japanese government ==
Japan's efforts to boost tourism are led by the Japan Tourism Agency (a bureau of the Ministry of Land, Infrastructure, Transport and Tourism) and the Japan National Tourism Organization (an independent administrative agency).

In 1995, Japan established the Welcome Plan 21 (a plan to double inbound tourists). This was followed by the Act on Promotion of Inbound Tourism through Enhancing Travel Convenience of Foreign Tourists, enacted in 1997.

In addition, the Visit Japan Campaign has been carried out since 2003.

In 2015, the number of foreign visitors to Japan surged to a record high of nearly 20 million. A key factor driving this surge was the government's easing of visa requirements, especially for Southeast Asian countries such as Malaysia & Indonesia.

Notably, in January 2015, Japan relaxed the requirements for issuing multiple-entry visas for Chinese tourists, allowing them to visit Japan multiple times during their validity period. As a result, the number of Chinese tourists visiting Japan throughout 2015 soared more than twofold compared to the previous year.

In March 2016, the government announced new targets aimed at making Japan an advanced tourism nation, including a goal of doubling the number of foreign visitors from the 2015 figure to 40 million by 2020, achieving 8 trillion yen (approximately US$52 billion) in visitor spending, and targeting 70 million overnight stays by foreigners in rural areas. This plan also included the formation of Destination Management Organizations (DMOs) and the relaxation of visa requirements for various countries.

Among the 20 countries and regions targeted for tourism promotion, visa issuance policies were relaxed for the five countries needing visas: the People's Republic of China, the Philippines, Vietnam, India, and the Russian Federation.

On May 13, 2016, to meet the goal of 40 million inbound travelers by 2020, the government announced opening previously restricted public facilities to the general public as one of the initiatives under the Tourism Vision to Support Tomorrow's Japan.

However, the number of foreign visitors plummeted due to the global outbreak of COVID-19. The Tourism White Paper published by the Japan Tourism Agency in June 2020 removed the target figure of 40 million annual visitors.

According to the data released by the Japan National Tourism Organization (JNTO) on November 16, 2022, the number of inbound travelers in October of that year was 499,000 (2.4 times higher than the previous month).

== Initiatives by industries ==
According to the Japan Association of Travel Agents, onboard announcements are offered in English (as well as other languages such as Korean and Chinese on the Kyushu Shinkansen and other trains and buses). English is also available in signage in train stations and instructions for ticket vending machines.

Starting October 1, 2016, JR East began implementing station numbering at 276 stations in the Tokyo metropolitan area, adding route indicators that combine alphabets and Arabic numerals to represent each station.

== High-value travelers ==
Foreign tourists who spend over one million yen (approximately US$6,500) per person in Japan are defined as high-value travelers. Although they only make up about 1% (290,000) of all inbound travelers, they account for approximately 11.5% (550 billion yen, approximately US$3.6 billion) of the total expenditure.

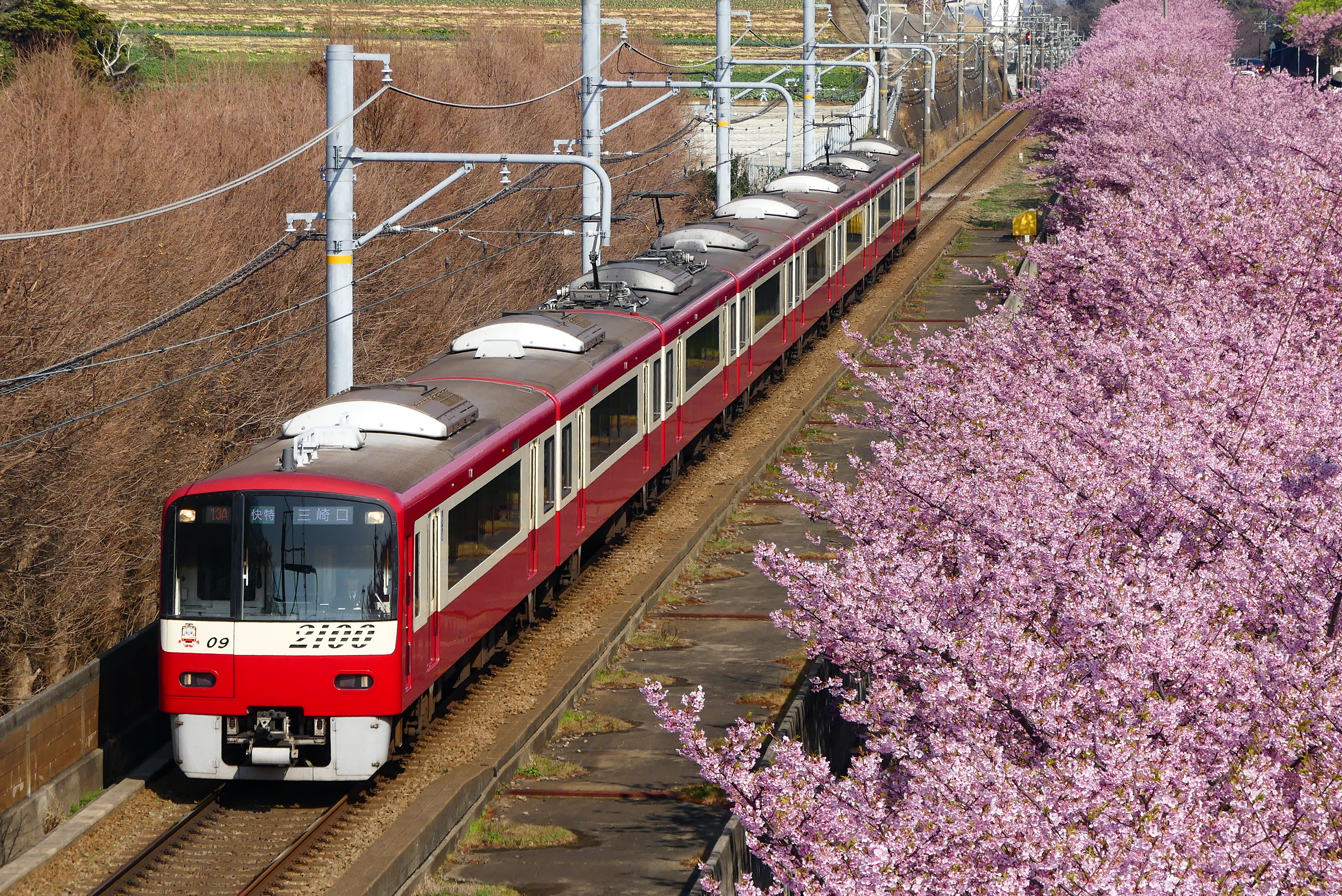
Cherry Blossoms on Keikyu-Kurihama-Line

== Chinese tourists and cherry blossom viewing ==
In 2015, the number of inbound tourists reached nearly 20 million, a record high. Among them, approximately 5 million were from China, and in April, the number of Chinese tourists exceeded 400,000, more than double the number from 2014. During this period, cherry blossom viewing tours became a popular trend among Chinese tourists.

While there are famous cherry blossom spots in China, the conception that Japan has the best spots has become firmly established. Many Chinese travel agencies’ websites featured promotions such as “5-night 6-day cherry blossom tours to Tokyo, Hakone, Kamakura, and Osaka” and “Cherry blossom viewing tours to the hotspots in Kyushu.”

According to a representative of a major Chinese online travel agency, Chinese overseas travel is shifting towards immersing in the local life and culture, and cherry blossom viewing in Japan is very popular.

On the Japanese side, efforts are spreading to capture the high demand for cherry blossom viewing following the peak season of the Spring Festival (Chinese/Lunar New Year). The Matsuzakaya department store's Ueno branch near Ueno Park, a famous cherry blossom viewing spot, increased the number of Chinese interpreters during the cherry blossom season, aiming to attract visitors for shopping after blossom viewing.

== Inbound visitors and the rise in official land prices ==
According to the official land prices announced by Japan's Ministry of Land, Infrastructure, Transport and Tourism in March 2016, the national average rose for the first time in eight years, partly due to the rapid increase in inbound visitors to Japan.

The official land price of Ginza in Chuo Ward, Tokyo, has hit a record high as the eastern center of Chinese tourists' binge shopping sprees. Shinsaibashi in Osaka's Chuo Ward, the western center of these binge shopping sprees, recorded the highest commercial land price appreciation, surpassing Ginza.

At Daimaru Department's flagship shop, the Daimaru Shinsaibashi store, duty-free sales in February 2016 doubled compared to the same month in 2015, showing a notable increase in revenue from inbound tourists. Consequently, Shinsaibashi witnessed investments targeting foreign visitors, such as the opening of the largest duty-free store of Laox (a major home appliance store) in February 2016. Six of the top ten locations with the highest rise rates in commercial land prices were in Osaka City.

The rise in official land prices due to the increase in inbound visitors also extended to tourist areas in rural Japan. In Kutchan Town, Hokkaido, home to the world-renowned ski resort Niseko, residential land prices rose by 19.7%, marking the highest growth rate among residential areas.

In Yufu City, Oita Prefecture, home to Yufuin Onsen hot springs, inbound tourists doubled in the five years leading up to 2015, and the land price in popular commercial areas along main streets rose by 15.4%, reaching almost the same level as central Oita City.

== The rapid increase in inbound visitors and the review of the National Government Licensed Guide Interpreter system ==
As of 2016, under the regulations of the Licensed Guide Interpreters Act (an exclusive business qualification), only interpreter guides who have passed the national examination and registered with the prefectural government can legally guide foreign tourists for compensation.

In response to this situation, the Japanese government's Council for Regulatory Reform pointed out in January 2016 that there was a shortage of tour guides to meet the demand of inbound travelers from Asian countries. In their proposal to the then Prime Minister Shinzo Abe on May 19, 2016, the Council requested a review of the system to allow paid guiding without a national certification, arguing that the business monopoly hindered the nation from advancing to a leading tourism destination in terms of both quantity and quality.

The travel industry, however, expressed a cautious stance on this issue. JTB, a major travel industry company, has 700 registered licensed guide interpreters. Hisao Yoshimura, executive director of JTB Global Marketing & Travel, said, “Some certified individuals do not meet our required standards. Even if paid guiding is allowed for those without qualifications, the number of people we can assign work will not increase unless overall quality improves.”

The board chairperson of the Japan Federation of Certified Guides also remarked, “Only qualified individuals with a proper understanding of Japanese culture and history should conduct paid guiding services. Allowing anyone to guide for a fee without certifications will legitimize ‘dark’ (unqualified) guides.”

== Issues ==
The number of inbound visitors to Japan reached a record high of over 19 million in 2015, but this ranked 16th globally and 5th in Asia.

In the same year, expenditure by inbound visitors totaled about US$19 billion, accounting for 0.4% of Japan's Gross Domestic Product (GDP), but, again, this figure is only about a quarter of that of Italy and France.

Furthermore, the Japan Tourism Agency reports issues such as retail stores not accepting credit cards and the difficulty in finding ATMs that allow cash withdrawals using credit cards issued outside of Japan.

In addition, the destinations of inbound visitors are concentrated in certain regions, with the top 10 prefectures, including Tokyo and Osaka, accounting for more than 80% of foreign guest accommodations. Therefore, the challenge is distributing the economic benefits of inbound consumption to rural regions.

Additionally, there is a shortage of personnel with language skills and a lack of accommodation facilities in major cities.

Notably, the shortage of hotels in large cities has become a problem. According to a summary report by Nikkei newspaper, the average room occupancy rate for 18 major hotels in Tokyo reached 84.5% in 2015, up 0.6 percentage points from 2014. The Japanese government promotes the use of ryokans, traditional Japanese inns, which have lower occupancy rates than hotels, while also legally expanding home-sharing (minpaku) to accommodate tourists in private residences for a fee.

Meanwhile, incidents have arisen due to a lack of intercultural communication and understanding between inbound visitors and Japanese citizens. The Japan Association of Travel Agents has emphasized the need for cultural awareness programs for both foreign visitors and the general Japanese public.

The number of inbound visitors using rental cars is also increasing. In 2015, the number of users reached approximately 75,000, quadrupling in five years.

However, an increase in traffic accidents has also been noted, as countries with high visitor numbers—such as China, South Korea, Taiwan, and the U.S.—drive on the right side of the road, unlike Japan. Particularly in Okinawa Prefecture, which has limited transportation options other than automobiles, traffic accidents involving inbound visitors reached 9,648 in 2016, nearly tripling over three years.

The Ministry of Land, Infrastructure, Transport and Tourism uses big data to identify accident-prone areas for foreign visitors and is implementing preventive measures such as multilingual safety alerts.
