= Japan Tourism Agency =

Tourist association

- 観光庁; Kankō-chō

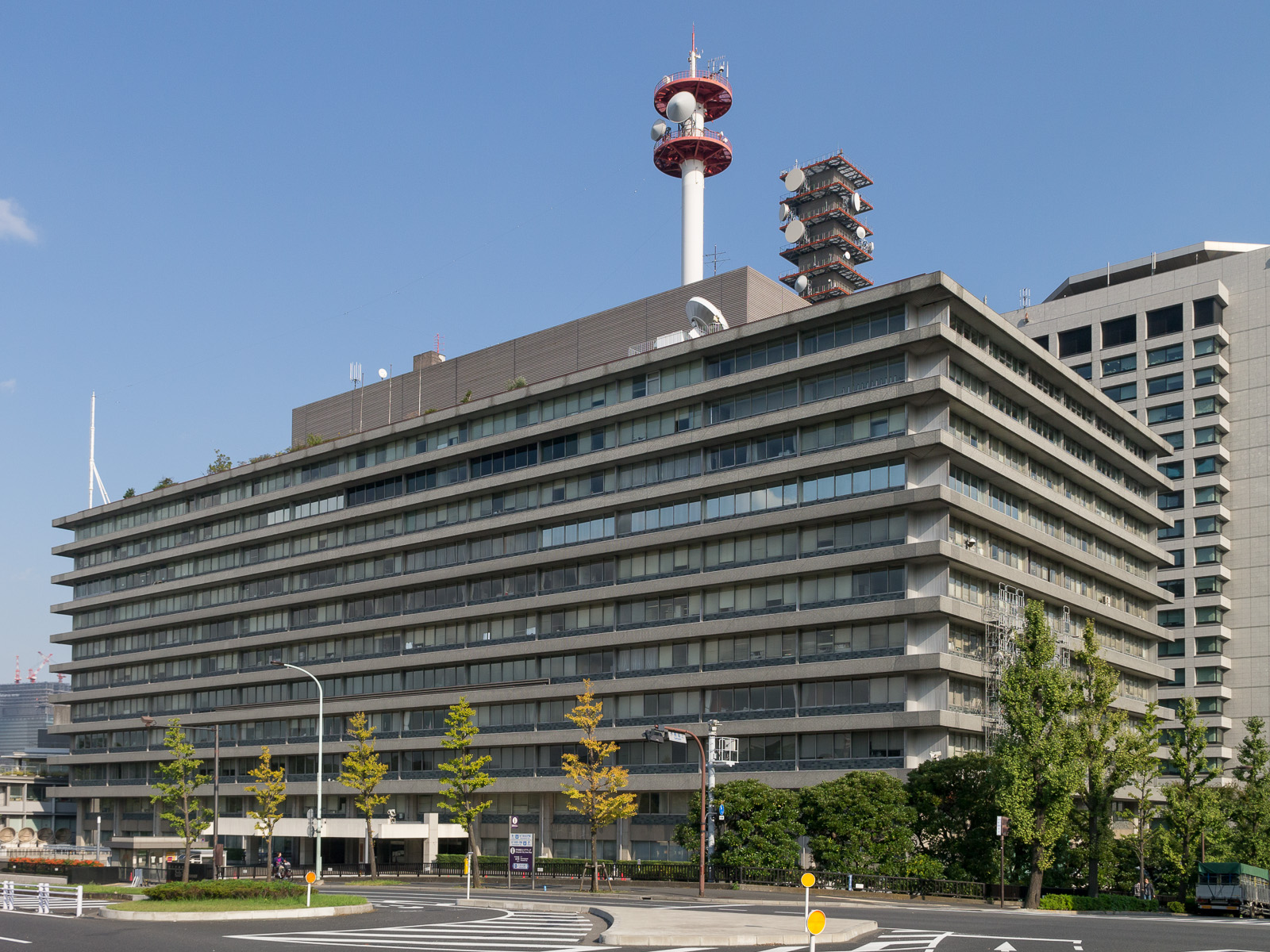
- Joint Government Building No. 3

Agency overview
- Formed: October 1, 2008
- Jurisdiction: Japan
- Headquarters: Yubinbango 100-8918, Chiyoda-ku, Kasumigaseki 2-chome No. 1 No. 3, Tokyo
- Employees: 200
- Annual budget: ¥26,438 million JPY
- Agency executives: Secretary, Shigeki Murata; Deputy Secretary, Norio Kimura
- Parent agency: Ministry of Land, Infrastructure, Transport and Tourism
- Website: www.mlit.go.jp/kankocho/en/

The Japan Tourism Agency (Japanese: 観光庁, Hepburn: Kankō-chō), JTA, is a Japanese government organization which was set up on October 1, 2008 as an agency of the Ministry of Land, Infrastructure, Transport and Tourism.

== Background of establishment ==
Japan Tourism Agency seated itself with intentions to stimulate local economies and to further international mutual understanding, following legislation of Basic Act on Promotion of Tourism Nation (in December 2006, to wholly revise Tourism Basic Act), committee resolutions in both Houses of the Diet in the legislation process, and a decision at a Cabinet meeting of Basic Plan (in June 2007) which was drawn as provided by the Basic Act. One legal basis of the Agency is the Act for Establishment of the Ministry of Land, Infrastructure, Transport, and Tourism.

The two committee resolutions (of almost the same contents) were made by the Committee on Land and Transport of each House of the Diet, to point out eight issues on which the government should take appropriate measures when it enforces the Basic Act. In issue No. 8, it was stated that the government should make efforts to set up a tourism agency.

In the Basic Plan, five fundamental targets were set, whose substances were, respectively, to increase the number of:

a. foreign tourists visiting Japan;
b. International meetings held in Japan;
c. nights for a stay in accommodations per one Japanese during domestic sightseeing tours;
d. Japanese tourists to overseas;
e. expenditure in Japan on sightseeing tours.

All five targets each had a numerical value.

== Departments ==
- General Affairs Division
- Tourism Industry Division
- International Tourism Policy Division
- International Exchange Promotion Division
- Tourism Area Promotion Department

== See also ==
- Japan National Tourism Organization
