= Hōtoku Ninomiya Shrine =

Shrine in Odawara, Kanagawa

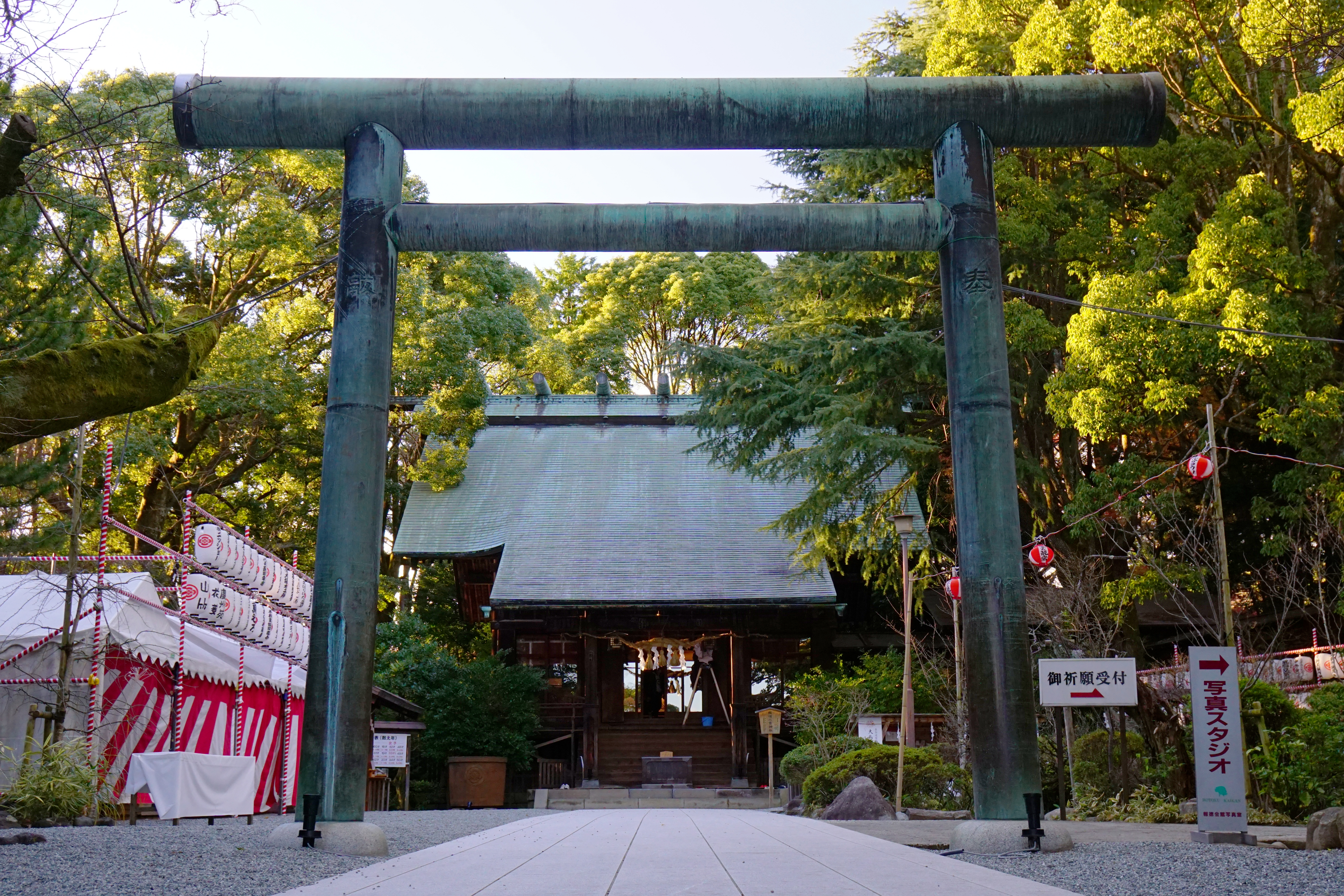
- Hōtoku Ninomiya Shrine

- Location within Japan

Religion
- Affiliation: Shinto

Location
- Coordinates: 35.2500°N 139.1528°E

Hōtoku Ninomiya Shrine (報徳二宮神社) is a Japanese Shinto shrine dedicated to Ninomiya Sontoku (二宮尊徳) and is located in the City of Odawara in Kanagawa prefecture, Japan.

== History ==
Ninomiya Sontoku was born in the village Kayama (栢山) in Odawara. And as for the great agricultural work he did in his lifetime and his moral and ethical teachings, the Hōtoku Association founded the Shrine in April 1894 (Meiji 27) on the Odawara Castle ground.

== Buildings ==
On the Shrine grounds are the main hall called "Honden" in which the spirituality is enshrined. Right next to the main building is the sub hall called "Gokitouden" which is used for ceremonies, if the main hall is already occupied. Between the second and third Shrine gate called Torii, are two local coffee shops ( Cafe Kinjiro, Cafe Kankitsu Club), where the staff sell original goods of the enshrined spirituality and local food. On the opposite site of the coffee shop is the "Hotoku Kaikan" a Wedding and Event hall in which all kinds of different projects are made: For example, a project to support local farmers "Kankitsu Club", an inbound tourism project called "Local Japan" and much more.

== See also ==
- List of Shinto shrines in Japan
