= Journal of Vacation Marketing =

- Discipline: Marketing
- Language: English
- Edited by: J. S. Perry Hobson

Publication details
- History: 1994-present
- Publisher: SAGE Publications
- Frequency: Quarterly

Standard abbreviations
- ISO 4: J. Vacat. Mark.

Indexing
- ISSN: 1356-7667 (print); 1479-1870 (web)
- OCLC no.: 890210057

Links
- Journal homepage; Online access; Online archive

The Journal of Vacation Marketing is a quarterly peer-reviewed academic journal that covers the field of marketing as related to the tourism, hospitality, and events industries. The editor-in-chief is J. S. Perry Hobson (Taylor's University). It was established in 1994, and is published by SAGE Publications.

== Abstracting and indexing ==
'The journal is abstracted and indexed in ABI/INFORM and Scopus.
