= Japan National Tourism Organization =

Administrative agency in Japan

- 国際観光振興機構; Kokusai Kankō Shinkō Kikō

Independent Administrative Institution overview
- Formed: October 1, 2003
- Preceding Independent Administrative Institution: International Tourism Promotion Organization
- Headquarters: 4-4-1 Yotsuya Shinjuku Ward, Tokyo 100-0006, Japan
- Employees: Officer 5 (Chairperson 1, Board 4 (including General Director 1), Auditor 2) (As of August 1, 2018). Full-time staff 171 (Secondary employees from countries etc. 22) March 31, 2018.
- Annual budget: 95,842,663,54 yen (as of March 31, 2018)
- Parent Independent Administrative Institution: Japan Tourism Agency
- Website: www.jnto.go.jp

The Japan National Tourism Organization, formerly known and still officially known in Japanese as the International Tourism Promotion Organization (国際観光振興機構, Kokusai Kankō Shinkō Kikō), JNTO, provides information about Japan to promote travel to and in the country. It was established in 1964 and its headquarters are in Yotsuya, Shinjuku-ku, Tokyo. The JNTO operates Tourist Information Centers (TICs) as well as a website. It disseminates information about transportation, lodging, food and beverage, and sight-seeing as well as published tourism statistics and market reports. It also provides support for international conventions and incentive events.

== Functions ==
JNTO is an Independent Administrative Institution of the government of Japan. Its publications and website assist in preparing travel itineraries within Japan, providing a wide range of travel information in English and other languages on transportation, accommodations, shopping and events. The materials are updated frequently.

While traveling in Japan, visitors may take advantage of the nationwide "i" Information System, which numbered 113 outlets in 2004. Each "i" center is an information source for the area it represents. The "i" centers are ordinarily located at railway stations or in city centers, and are easily recognized by their logo, a red question mark with the word "information" printed underneath.

JNTO sponsors a Goodwill Guide Program, through which some 47,000 bilingual volunteers assist visitors from abroad. They earn the right to wear the program's identifying badge, a white pigeon superimposed upon a globe. Throughout Japan, there are 77 Systematized Goodwill Guide groups (SGG) consisting mostly of students, housewives and retirees who engage in a variety of activities using their foreign language skills. Some groups offer a free preset walking tour, for which the visitor only needs to go to a pre-established place at a certain date and time, while others are available to meet tourists on request. There is no charge for the service of the Goodwill Guides, as they are volunteers, only their travel expenses and their admissions to tourist facilities, and for shared meals.

Services of professional guides and interpreters may be retained through the Japan Guide Association or the Japan Federation of Licensed Guides. JNTO administers Licensed Guide Interpreter Examination. A total of some 1,550 licensed guide-interpreters are registered with these organizations, each carrying a registration card issued by the governor of the relevant prefecture.

== Branches ==
JNTO maintains 26 offices around the world. Overseas offices provide up-to-date information on travel to and within Japan, place publicity in the media and cooperate with journalists, participate in travel fairs and exhibitions, assist the local travel industry in developing tours, and conduct tourism-related research.

JNTO opened a new office in Stockholm, Sweden on March 4, 2024, due to its agreement on Japanese-Scandinavian corporation. The office in Stockholm represents also other Scandinavian and Baltic countries.

== See also ==
- Japan Tourism Agency
- Tourism in Japan
