= List of American Academy of Arts and Sciences members (1994–2005) =

The following is a list of elected members of the American Academy of Arts and Sciences from the years 1994 to 2005.

== 1994 ==
- Hans Aarsleff
- Jan Drewes Achenbach
- Frances Elizabeth Allen
- Frederick Wayne Alt
- John Charles Avise
- Jack Edward Baldwin
- Leonard Barkan
- Lucius Barker
- Paul A. Bartlett
- Marlene Belfort
- Chester Gordon Bell
- Thomas Bender
- Albert F. Bennett
- Margaret Hilda Bent
- Malcolm Bilson
- Norman M. Bradburn
- Haim Brezis
- Roberta Lea Brilmayer
- Robert A. Brown
- Theodore Lawrence Brown
- Colin Goetze Campbell
- Marvin Harry Caruthers
- Jean-Pierre Changeux
- Thomas Warren Cline
- Marjorie Benedict Cohn
- Ronald Raphael Coifman
- James Pierpont Comer
- Joseph T. Coyle
- Robert Dallek
- Mirjan R. Damaska
- Drew Saunders Days III
- Donald James DePaolo
- Robert Carr Dynes
- Diana Eck
- Claire Mintzer Fagin
- Drew Gilpin Faust
- Steven Feld
- Gary J. Feldman
- Harvey V. Fineberg
- Marye Anne Fox
- Jack H. Freed
- Elaine V. Fuchs
- Frank F. Furstenberg, Jr.
- Ellen V. Futter
- Philip Glass
- David VanNorman Goeddel
- Eville Gorham
- Jerry Richard Green
- Linda Greenhouse
- Robert H. Grubbs
- Zach Winter Hall
- Ulf Hannerz
- Carl Eugene Heiles
- Eric Johnson Heller
- David Forbes Hendry
- Eileen Mavis Hetherington
- Thomas Hines
- Philip John Holmes
- H. Robert Horvitz
- Susan Band Horwitz
- Richard Olding Hynes
- Robert A. Kagan
- Robert E. Kahn
- Thomas Kailath
- Arthur Karlin
- Alan Curtis Kay
- Nikki Ragozin Keddie
- William Nimmons Kelley
- David Woods Kemper
- Walid Ahmad Khalidi
- Sung-Hou Kim
- Rosalind E. Krauss
- Keith Krehbiel
- Anthony Townsend Kronman
- Shrinivas Ramchandra Kulkarni
- Madeleine M. Kunin
- Arthur Landy
- Robert Samuel Langer
- Laurence Lesser
- Wendy Lesser
- James Levine
- Elliott Hershel Lieb
- Sharon R. Long
- Stewart Macaulay
- Jane J. Mansbridge
- Charles Frederick Manski
- Hazel Rose Markus
- Eric Stark Maskin
- Cormac McCarthy
- William H. McClain
- David McCullough
- Jerome John McGann
- Richard A. Meserve
- Thomas J. Meyer
- Yves Francois Meyer
- Mary Ellen Miller
- Joseph Standard Miller
- Alexander Nehamas
- James Rufus Norris, Jr.
- Stephen James O'Brien
- Stephen Kitay Orgel
- June Elaine Osborn
- Charles Samuel Peskin
- Vivian Winona Pinn
- Karl Stark Pister
- Sylvia Poggioli
- David E. Pritchard
- Richard Emeric Quandt
- Pasko Rakic
- Elio Secondo Raviola
- John D. Reppy
- JoAnne Stewart Richards
- Paul A. Robinson
- Kevin Roche
- Ronald Lynn Rogowski
- Antone Kimball Romney
- Carol Marguerite Rose
- Richard Rose
- James Edward Rothman
- Michael Rothschild
- Ariel Rubinstein
- Angelica Zander Rudenstine
- Arlene Warmbrunn Saxonhouse
- Wolfgang M. Schmidt
- Robert James Shiller
- David Oliver Siegmund
- Leon Melvyn Simon
- Beryl Brintnall Simpson
- Anna Marie Skalka
- Theda Skocpol
- Brian Skyrms
- Larry L. Smarr
- Jane Graves Smiley
- Robert Martin Solovay
- Davor Solter
- Patricia Meyer Spacks
- Stephen Frederick Starr
- Louis Wade Sullivan
- Leonard Susskind
- Ivan Edward Sutherland
- Dennis F. Thompson
- Glauco Pasquale Tocchini-Valentini
- Alain L. J. F. Touraine
- Robert Morris Townsend
- Leo Treitler
- Donald Lawson Turcotte
- Anne Tyler
- David Walker
- H. Eric Wanner
- G. Edward White
- Andrew J. Wiles
- Lewis T. Williams
- James David Wolfensohn
- Charles Edward Young

== 1995 ==
- Morton I. Abramowitz
- Christopher Henry Achen
- Everett Anderson
- Kwame Anthony Appiah
- Clyde Frederick Barker
- Larry Martin Bartels
- Linda May Bartoshuk
- Seyla Benhabib
- Bruce J. Berne
- Manuel Blum
- Piet Borst
- James Hemphill Brown
- David Alvin Buchsbaum
- Dennis Anthony Carson
- Stephen Lisle Carter
- Vinton Gray Cerf
- Jon Christel Clardy
- Jean Comaroff
- John Lionel Comaroff
- Richard Arthur Crawford
- Louis Dupre
- Anne Howland Ehrlich
- Robert Chester Ellickson
- Robert Fry Engle
- David Hackett Fischer
- Zachary Fisk
- Owen Mitchell Fiss
- Wendell Helms Fleming
- Alan Bicksler Fowler
- Harry Gordon Frankfurt
- Hillel Furstenberg
- John Lewis Gaddis
- Howard E. Gardner
- Gordon Nelson Gill
- Stephen Payne Goff
- Peter Alexis Gourevitch
- Susan Graham
- Agnes Gund
- Rachel C. Hadas
- William Happer
- Stephen Ernest Harris
- J. Bryan Hehir
- John L. Hennessy
- Barbara Herman
- Richard Ralph Hudson
- Hiroo Imura
- Terence Henry Irwin
- Henryk Iwaniec
- Paul Christian Jennings
- Betsy Jolas
- Herbert Leon Kessler
- Judith Elisabeth Kimble
- Charles Kimmel
- Richard D. Klausner
- Joseph Leo Koerner
- Stephen Michael Kosslyn
- David Dennis Laitin
- Phyllis Lambert
- Alan Marc Lambowitz
- Neal Francis Lane
- Hartmut Lehmann
- Raphael David Levine
- William Carl Lineberger
- Geoffrey Ernest Richard Lloyd
- Shirley Mahaley Malcom
- Douglas S. Massey
- Dusa McDuff
- Ian Russell McEwan
- Richard Alan Meier
- Douglas A. Melton
- Robert M. Metcalfe
- Barbara Jean Meyer
- Ira Martin Millstein
- Katharine Milton
- Robert Harris Mnookin
- Gary Saul Morson
- Shigetada Nakanishi
- Bruce Lee Nauman
- Malden Charles Nesheim
- Joseph Paul Newhouse
- Ronald Leslie Numbers
- John W. O'Malley
- Claus Offe
- James Lowe Peacock III
- William Daniel Phillips
- Charles Young Prescott
- Stephen Joseph Pyne
- Veerabhadran Ramanathan
- Hunter Ripley Rawlings III
- Anthony Christopher Sanford Readhead
- D. Raj Reddy
- Jehuda Reinharz
- Jeffrey Warren Roberts
- Robert Gayle Roeder
- Roberta Romano
- Robert M. Rosenzweig
- William Bailey Russel
- Bruce Martin Russett
- Richard James Saykally
- William H. Schlesinger
- Richard Lee Schmalensee
- Stuart Lee Schreiber
- Alan Schwartz
- Larry Jay Shapiro
- John B. Shoven
- Sean Carl Solomon
- Robert Jeffrey Sternberg
- G. David Tilman
- Susan Mary Treggiari
- James Wellington Truran, Jr.
- Roger Harold Unger
- Hal Ronald Varian
- Diana Chapman Walsh
- Gungwu Wang
- Michael Spencer Waterman
- Gerald Westheimer
- Hans Lennart Rudolf Wigzell
- Jay Wright
- Peter Edwin Wright
- William Allan Wulf
- King-Wai Yau
- Anne Buckingham Young

== 1996 ==
- Karim Aga Khan IV
- Christopher Wolfgang John Alexander
- Jeanne Altmann
- Boris Altshuler
- Kathryn Virginia Anderson
- Spyros Artavanis-Tsakonas
- Alan David Baddeley
- Dorothy Ford Bainton
- Douglas Gordon Baird
- Russell Banks
- Solomon R. Benatar
- Joe Claude Bennett
- May Roberta Berenbaum
- Peter Stephen Bing
- Helen Margaret Blau
- Bill Bradley
- Maurice S. Brookhart
- Jonathan Brown
- Larry Lee Bumpass
- Lisa Sowle Cahill
- Albert Carnesale
- Brian Charlesworth
- Adele Chatfield-Taylor
- Carol J. Clover
- Karen Schweers Cook
- William J. Courtenay
- Gary Walter Cox
- David Pafford Crews
- William Drayton
- Thomas Ehrlich
- Richard R. Ernst
- Nancy Marguerite Farriss
- Kent Vaughn Flannery
- Richard Irving Ford
- Edward Norval Fortson
- Norman Robert Foster
- Richard James Franke
- Richard B. Freeman
- Jacob Aharon Frenkel
- Marc Fumaroli
- Douglas Joel Futuyma
- Elsa Garmire
- C.W. Gear
- Alexander N. Glazer
- Laurie Hollis Glimcher
- Robert Phillip Goldman
- Joseph W. Goodman
- Edward Everett Harlow, Jr.
- Jennifer L. Hochschild
- Tomas Gustav Magnus Hokfelt
- Peter Maxwell Howley
- Martin Evan Jay
- Michael Cole Jensen
- Thomas Hillman Jordan
- Martin John Kemp
- David Michael Kennedy
- Sergiu Klainerman
- Eric Ingvald Knudsen
- Nancy Jane Kopell
- Jane Kramer
- Howard G. Krane
- Story Cleland Landis
- Anthony James Leggett
- Hendrik Willem Lenstra, Jr.
- Michael Levine
- Alan Lightman
- Rodolfo Riascos Llinas
- Richard Marc Losick
- Thomas Eugene Lovejoy
- Fumihiko Maki
- Jean Matter Mandler
- Karl Ulrich Mayer
- Perry Lee McCarty
- Michael William McConnell
- Joel Mokyr
- C. Bradley Moore
- Susumu Nishimura
- Bert W. O'Malley
- John Alexander Oates, Jr.
- Laurie Dewar Olin
- Larry Eugene Overman
- Charles Stedman Parmenter
- Carole Pateman
- Joseph Pedlosky
- Paul Elliott Peterson
- Peter Charles Bonest Phillips
- James Michael Poterba
- Michael C. J. Putnam
- Anna Marie Quindlen
- Robert Richard Rando
- Ellen Rosand
- Marshall Rose
- Ira Rubinoff
- Jeffrey David Sachs
- Moshe Safdie
- Richard Lawrence Salmon
- David Satcher
- Henry Schacht
- Daniel Lawrence Schacter
- Gjertrud Schnackenberg
- Jerome Borges Schneewind
- Matthew P. Scott
- Richard Sennett
- Salvatore Settis
- Robert Bernard Shapiro
- Richard Martin Shiffrin
- Kenneth I. Shine
- Carolyn Spellman Shoemaker
- Sydney Shoemaker
- Michael Louis Shuler
- Kai Lennart Simons
- Lawrence Sklar
- Larry Ryan Squire
- Claude Mason Steele
- Thomas Peter Stossel
- Marilyn Strathern
- Harry Suhl
- Kathleen Marie Sullivan
- John David Summers
- Gerald Jay Sussman
- Piotr Sztompka
- Saul A. Teukolsky
- Gerard Toulouse
- Michael Stanley Turner
- Kensal Edward van Holde
- Anthony Vidler
- George Joseph Vining
- David Alexander Vogan
- Kenneth Wilcox Wachter
- E. Bruce Watson
- James Lee Watson
- Gerhard Ludwig Weinberg
- Barry R. Weingast
- Mary Jane West-Eberhard
- Robert Louis Wilken
- Owen N. Witte
- Chi-Huey Wong
- Sau Lan Yu Wu
- Alexey Vladimirovich Yablokov
- Efim Zelmanov
- Nicholas Themistocles Zervas

== 1997 ==
- Francois M. Abboud
- Shirley S. Abrahamson
- Robert Kemp Adair
- John Adams
- Alan Altshuler
- George E. Andrews
- Arjun Appadurai
- Elizabeth Ellery Bailey
- Stephanie Barron
- B. Douglas Bernheim
- Pamela J. Bjorkman
- Steven George Boxer
- Bob Branch Buchanan
- Lincoln Chih-ho Chen
- Elizabeth Ann Clark
- John Collins Coffee, Jr.
- Johnnetta B. Cole
- Antoine Compagnon
- Mihaly Csikszentmihalyi
- Peter Dallos
- Antonio R. Damasio
- Hanna Damasio
- Arthur P. Dempster
- Jack E. Dixon
- Jack David Dunitz
- Gerald Early
- William Allen Eaton
- Barry Eichengreen
- Ronald M. Evans
- George W. Flynn
- Uta Francke
- David Freedberg
- Charles Fried
- Michael Friedman
- Henry Fuchs
- Michael Saunders Gazzaniga
- Sandra M. Gilbert
- Robert James Gordon
- Barbara Rosemary Grant
- Peter Raymond Grant
- Laura H. Greene
- Gene M. Grossman
- Amy Gutmann
- Stephen L. Hauser
- Russell Hemley
- Michael Herzfeld
- Karl Hess
- David Ho
- David Hockney
- David A. Hollinger
- Donald R. Hopkins
- James Stephen House
- Michael Hout
- Richard Timothy Hunt
- Andrew P. Ingersoll
- Robert Israel
- Deborah Jowitt
- Yale Kamisar
- George Anthony Kateb
- Hiroya Kawanabe
- Cynthia J. Kenyon
- Linda K. Kerber
- Miles Vincent Klein
- Bill Kovach
- Donald Stephen Lamm
- Russell Lande
- Charles H. Langmuir
- Ronald Michael Latanision
- Douglas Laycock
- Philip Randolph Lee
- Kristin Luker
- Lamberto Maffei
- Joyce Marcus
- Wynton Marsalis
- Alice Munro
- Sidney R. Nagel
- Gary B. Nash
- Richard Robinson Nelson
- Bruno Nettl
- Sam Nunn
- James T. Patterson
- Stanley G. Payne
- Norman Pearlstine
- Marjorie Gabrielle Perloff
- Chester Middlebrook Pierce
- Tomaso Poggio
- Robert Hugh Porter
- Douglas C. Rees
- Kenneth A. Ribet
- Condoleezza Rice
- Richard J. Roberts
- Renato Rosaldo
- Michael Rosbash
- Steven J. Rosenstone
- Martin Saunders
- Stephen A. Shectman
- Roger Valentine Short
- Richard A. Shweder
- Ruth Simmons
- Montgomery Slatkin
- Paul M. Sniderman
- László Somfai
- Richard Rustom K. Sorabji
- David Souter
- Elizabeth S. Spelke
- James A. Spudich
- Katepalli R. Sreenivasan
- Theodore Ellis Stebbins, Jr.
- Eric J. Sundquist
- Robert Tjian
- John C. Tully
- J. Anthony Tyson
- Bas C. van Fraassen
- Grace Wahba
- David Burton Wake
- John Michael Wallace
- John Walsh
- Rosanna Warren
- Patty Jo Watson
- Watt W. Webb
- Robert E. Williams
- Michel Zink

== 1998 ==
- Walter Abish
- Eric G. Adelberger
- Linda H. Aiken
- Wyatt W. Anderson
- William Allan Bardeen
- Paul Benacerraf
- Arnold J. Berk
- Ellen S. Berscheid
- Henry S. Bienen
- David P. Billington
- Vincent A. Blasi
- Catherine Brechignac
- David Bromwich
- Louis Eugene Brus
- Jose Alberto Cabranes
- Federico Capasso
- David E. Card
- James Carroll
- Vija Celmins
- Constance Louise Cepko
- Joanne Chory
- Adrienne Elizabeth Clarke
- Chuck Close
- Francis S. Collins
- Pierre Corvol
- F. Fleming Crim
- Robert Floyd Curl Jr.
- Frank A. D'Accone
- William F. DeGrado
- David Ferry
- Robert Warren Field
- Cornell Hugh Fleischer
- G. David Forney, Jr.
- Drew Fudenberg
- William Fulton
- Anthony Giddens
- Doris Kearns Goodwin
- Fan Chung Graham
- Hans Ulrich Gumbrecht
- Ellen T. Harris
- Daniel L. Hartl
- Leland H. Hartwell
- Bertil Hille
- Charles Hirschman
- Darleane Christian Hoffman
- Nancy Hopkins
- Maureen Howard
- Clyde A. Hutchison III
- Diane Johnson
- Christopher Prestige Jones
- Peter Wilcox Jones
- Edward L. Keenan
- Randall L. Kennedy
- Eric Barrington Keverne
- Gary King
- Margaret Galland Kivelson
- Julia Kristeva
- Patricia K. Kuhl
- Richard Erskine Leakey
- Ruth Lehmann
- Richard E. Lenski
- Richard Levin
- Richard Jay Light
- Penelope Jo Maddy
- Cora Bagley Marrett
- John C. Mather
- Curtis Tracy McMullen
- Steven Millhauser
- Dino Moras
- Robert Alexander Mundell
- Alicia H. Munnell
- Kevin M. Murphy
- Ken Nakayama
- Francis Oakley
- Elinor Ruth Ochs
- Eric Newell Olson
- Neil D. Opdyke
- Christopher Francis Patten
- Steven Pinker
- Alejandro Portes
- Richard Powers
- Helen R. Quinn
- Mitchell T. Rabkin
- Marcus E. Raichle
- Pierre Ramond
- John Shepard Reed
- Donald H. Regan
- Daniel Roche
- Alvin Roth
- Richard H. Scheller
- John P. Schiffer
- David Neil Sedley
- Vladimir A. Shuvalov
- Yum-Tong Siu
- Mitchell Lloyd Sogin
- Edward Ira Solomon
- George Soros
- Nicholas H. Stern
- Samuel I. Stupp
- Elizabeth Alison Thompson
- John G. Thompson
- Richard Winyu Tsien
- Billie Lee Turner II
- Michele Francoise Vergne
- Miguel Virasoro
- Jeremy James Waldron
- Immanuel Wallerstein
- Kendall Lewis Walton
- Rainer Weiss
- Michael J. Welsh
- Richard White
- Reed Brendon Wickner
- Carl E. Wieman
- John Noble Wilford
- Carl Wu
- Pauline Yu
- John Raymond Zaller
- Neal Zaslaw
- Rolf Martin Zinkernagel
- Stephen Lawrence Zipursky
- Jacob Ziv

== 1999 ==
- Jane Alexander
- Stephen Robert Anderson
- John Robert Anderson
- Akito Arima
- Clay Margrave Armstrong
- Alan J. Auerbach
- Jonathan Barnes
- Percy Barnevik
- Robert M. Berdahl
- Michael Boudin
- Timothy Bresnahan
- Howard Franklin Bunn
- Lewis C. Cantley
- Anne Carson
- David M. Ceperley
- Robert D. Cooter
- Brian P. Copenhaver
- Lester Crown
- Bruce Cumings
- Veena Das
- Guy R. P. David
- Walter Dellinger
- Francois N. Diederich
- Dennis A. Dougherty
- Louise Erdrich
- Daniel J. Evans
- Jonathan Fanton
- Daniel A. Farber
- Michael D. Fayer
- Douglas T. Fearon
- Walter Charles Cornelius Fiers
- Alan Finkelstein
- Daniel S. Fisher
- Lee Friedlander
- Robert G. Gallager
- Claire L. Gaudiani
- John Geanakoplos
- Rochel Gelman
- Ronald J. Gilson
- Michael A. Gimbrone, Jr.
- Lila R. Gleitman
- Richard J. Goldstone
- Roberto Gonzalez Echevarria
- James Russell Gordley
- Susan Gottesman
- Jorie Graham
- Charles G. Gross
- Paul D. Guyer
- Wick C. Haxton
- Martha Patricia Haynes
- Walter B. Hewlett
- Susan Howe
- Louis Joseph Ignarro
- David Jerison
- Bill Joy
- Jerome P. Kassirer
- Elihu Katz
- Thomas C. Kaufman
- Garrison Keillor
- Charles Frederick Kennel
- Wolfgang Ketterle
- Mary-Claire King
- V. A. Kolve
- Roger D. Kornberg
- Eric S. Lander
- Thomas Laqueur
- Judith W. Leavitt
- John O. Ledyard
- Typhoon Lee
- Wen-Hsiung Li
- Lawrence Lipking
- Harvey F. Lodish
- Joan Massague
- Martha K. McClintock
- Christopher F. McKee
- Marcia K. McNutt
- Michael Menaker
- Josef Michl
- George Mitchell
- Terry M. Moe
- Barry Munitz
- Roddam Narasimha
- Kim Nasmyth
- Peter Nicholas
- Roger Andrew Nicoll
- Harry F. Noller
- Mary Beth Norton
- Tim O'Brien
- Emiko Ohnuki-Tierney
- Ursula Oppens
- Jeffrey D. Palmer
- Thomas Pavel
- Alan S. Perelson
- Alexander Pines
- Robert A. Pollak
- Dale Purves
- Martin Raff
- Jack N. Rakove
- Mamphela Ramphele
- John Reid
- Peter B. Rhines
- William C. Richardson
- Morton S. Roberts
- Elihu Rose
- Hans Thomas Rossby
- Bernard Rossier
- John Gerard Ruggie
- Jeremy Arac Sabloff
- Boris G. Saltykov
- Myriam P. Sarachik
- Juergen Schrempp
- Gertrud Schüpbach
- Robert E. Scott
- Christine Seidman
- Jonathan Seidman
- Barbara Herrnstein Smith
- Jack Snyder
- Elliott Sober
- Thomas Spencer
- Steven Spielberg
- Jack W. Szostak
- Jean E. Taylor
- Lars Y. Terenius
- Craig B. Thompson
- Michael Trebilcock
- Calvin Trillin
- Dale J. Van Harlingen
- David Ward
- James Webster
- Joseph H. H. Weiler
- Cornel West
- Edmund White
- Malcolm H. Wiener
- Michael H. Wigler
- Irene J. Winter
- Peter Thomas Wolczanski
- Susan Rose Wolf
- Eugene Wong
- Adam Zagajewski

== 2000 ==
- Martina Arroyo
- David Austen-Smith
- Roger Shaler Bagnall
- Jeremiah Abraham Barondess
- Lucian Arye Bebchuk
- Steven M. Block
- Richard Ewen Borcherds
- Willard Lee Boyd
- Nicholas F. Brady
- Robert Brandom
- Joan S. Brugge
- Stephen Leffler Buchwald
- Bruce E. Cain
- Roberto Calasso
- John Y. Campbell
- Nancy E. Cantor
- John E. Carlstrom
- Paul DeWitt Carrington
- Hal Caswell
- William A. Catterall
- John T. Chambers
- David E. Clapham
- Donald Delbert Clayton
- Randall Collins
- Joel Conarroe
- Gordon Conway
- Thomas Cook
- Robert Coover
- Elizabeth A. Craig
- Michael G. Crandall
- Roberto Augusto DaMatta
- Mark M. Davis
- Edward Michael De Robertis
- Jan de Vries
- Placido Domingo
- Jonathan Manne Dorfan
- William F. Dove
- Richard Slator Dunn
- William G. Eberhard
- Robert H. Edwards
- Peter David Eisenman
- David T. Ellwood
- William Nichol Eskridge Jr.
- Michael Frayn
- Jean M. J. Fréchet
- Wendy L. Freedman
- Saul Friedländer
- Arthur Gelb
- Michael Erwin Gellert
- Louis V. Gerstner, Jr.
- Arturo Gomez-Pompa
- Roger S.M.A. Guesnerie
- Allan Gurganus
- Jan-Ake Gustafsson
- Susan Easton Hanson
- Franz-Ulrich Hartl
- Teresa F. Heinz
- David M. Hillis
- Paul W. Hoffman
- Denis Hollier
- Stanley O. Ikenberry
- David Jablonski
- Ray S. Jackendoff
- Torrence V. Johnson
- Anita Katherine Jones
- Charles H. Kahn
- Ira Katznelson
- Mervyn King
- Thomas Kinsella
- Harold Hongju Koh
- David L. Kohlstedt
- Douglas E. Koshland
- Robert M. Krauss
- John Richard Krebs
- Thomas Krens
- Edward Paul Lazear
- Stephen R. Leone
- Richard Alan Lerner
- Robert D. Levin
- Saul Levmore
- Lance Malcolm Liebman
- Martin Lipton
- Donald Sewell Lopez, Jr.
- Glenn C. Loury
- George W. Lucas
- Thomas Lee Magnanti
- Ann Elizabeth McDermott
- Heather McHugh
- David W. McLaughlin
- Helen V. Milner
- Charles W. Misner
- Paul Muldoon
- Andrew W. Murray
- Jeremy Nathans
- Daniel M. Neumark
- Agnes Ida Benedicte Nicolaisen
- George Papanicolaou
- Annabel M. Patterson
- Roger M. Perlmutter
- Michael E. Peskin
- Hidde L. Ploegh
- Menahem Pressler
- Hugh B. Price
- Carol L. Prives
- Judith Livant Rapoport
- Claude Rawson
- David W. Rohde
- Paul Michael Romer
- Paul Rozin
- Robert Ryman
- David Warren Sabean
- Randy W. Schekman
- Ian Shapiro
- Kay Kaufman Shelemay
- Andrei Shleifer
- Jonathan Z. Smith
- Lawrence W. Sonsini
- Paul W. Sternberg
- James A. Stimson
- Lars E. O. Svensson
- Iván Szelényi
- Clifford J. Tabin
- Joseph S. Takahashi
- David W. Tank
- Richard H. Thaler
- Michael Oliver Thorner
- Daniel C. Tsui
- Leslie Ungerleider
- Andries van Dam
- Inder M. Verma
- Bill Viola
- Robert Manuel Wald
- John David Weeks
- Ewald Rudolf Weibel
- Benjamin Weiss
- W. Hugh Woodin
- Moshe Yaniv
- Andrew C. C. Yao

== 2001 ==
- Jill Abramson
- Dilip J. Abreu
- Madeleine Korbel Albright
- John Aldrich
- Woody Allen
- C. David Allis
- Edward Ayers
- John H. Baker
- Teodolinda Barolini
- Riley P. Bechtel
- Gillian Beer
- Ben S. Bernanke
- Timothy J. Berners-Lee
- Sara Sweezy Berry
- Gordon M. Binder
- Allan M. Brandt
- Eli Broad
- Maurice B. Burg
- Guy L. Bush
- Richard M. Buxbaum
- Mary Schmidt Campbell
- Susan E. Carey
- Nancy Cartwright
- Anthony Cerami
- William H. Chafe
- Demetrios Christodoulou
- Mary Sue Coleman
- George Henry Conrades
- Frederick Cooper
- John M. Cooper
- Suzanne Cory
- Thomas Crow
- Jonathan Culler
- James Cuno
- Constantine M. Dafermos
- Stephen Darwall
- Robert Addison Day
- Pietro V. De Camilli
- Andrew Delbanco
- William M. Denevan
- Morton M. Denn
- David DeRosier
- Robert Desimone
- Ronald Alvin DeVore
- W. S. Di Piero
- Douglas W. Diamond
- Ariel Dorfman
- Michael W. Doyle
- Greg J. Duncan
- Eli N. Evans
- Peter Evans
- Jeffrey Scott Flier
- Henry W. Foster, Jr.
- Dorothea Frede
- Frank Galati
- Charles R. Gallistel
- Charles D. Gilbert
- Sid Gilman
- Philip D. Gingerich
- Shafi Goldwasser
- Antonio Marion Gotto, Jr.
- Dieter Grimm
- Bernard N. Grofman
- Michael Grunstein
- Alma Guillermoprieto
- Jeffrey C. Hall
- John Benjamin Heywood
- Rosalyn Higgins
- John G. Hildebrand
- Brigid L. M. Hogan
- Matthew Holden, Jr.
- Freeman A. Hrabowski III
- Wayne Lester Hubbell
- Richard Lewis Huganir
- Barbara Imperiali
- Jeremy Bradford Cook Jackson
- Irwin Mark Jacobs
- Frances C. James
- Kathleen Hall Jamieson
- James A. Johnson
- Quincy Jones
- Jon H. Kaas
- Lawrence F. Katz
- Robert C. Kennicutt, Jr.
- Steven Allan Kivelson
- Christine Marion Korsgaard
- Richard Kramer
- Douglas A. Lauffenburger
- Paul LeClerc
- Seng Tee Lee
- Jeffrey Marc Leiden
- Margaret Levi
- Sanford Victor Levinson
- Stuart M. Linn
- David Morse Livingston
- Eve Marder
- Michael A. Marletta
- Margaret H. Marshall
- Giuseppe E. Mazzotta
- Mathew D. McCubbins
- Jacques Mehler
- Ira Mellman
- William Esco Moerner
- Lorrie Moore
- Cherry A. Murray
- Burt Neuborne
- Elissa L. Newport
- Ryoji Noyori
- Roeland Nusse
- Gilbert S. Omenn
- Geneva Overholser
- Christos Papadimitriou
- Torsten Persson
- Robert Plomin
- Klaus Rajewsky
- Don Michael Randel
- Mark A. Ratner
- Stephen W. Raudenbush
- Kenneth N. Raymond
- Judith Resnik
- William S. Reznikoff
- Diana Rigg
- Paul H. Roberts
- Kenneth S. Rogoff
- F. James Rohlf
- Barbara A. Romanowicz
- E. John Rosenwald, Jr.
- Robert Rosner
- Lucia B. Rothman-Denes
- Robert E. Rubin
- Daniel Rubinfeld
- Michael Joseph Ryan
- Luc Marie Sante
- Joseph Schlessinger
- Gerald Schubert
- Elisabeth Schussler Fiorenza
- Joanna Scott
- Thomas Dyer Seeley
- Nathan Seiberg
- Teddy I. Seidenfeld
- John Sexton
- Wallace Shawn
- Kathryn A. Sikkink
- Leslie Marmon Silko
- Werner Sollors
- Stephen Sondheim
- Ernest Sosa
- Timothy Alan Springer
- Andrew Strominger
- Eva Tardos
- Gary Tomlinson
- Eugene Ulrich
- J. Craig Venter
- Andrew J. Viterbi
- Lawrence Weschler
- John Burnard West
- Ralph K. Winter
- M. Norton Wise
- Stanford E. Woosley
- James Wright
- Margaret H. Wright
- Edward Anthony Wrigley
- Fred Wudl
- Horng-Tzer Yau
- Janet L. Yellen
- Mark G. Yudof
- Froma I. Zeitlin
- Charles Zuker

== 2002 ==
- Bernard William Agranoff
- Amnon Aharony
- Giuliano Amato
- Richard A. Andersen
- David J. Anderson
- Nancy C. Andreasen
- R. Douglas Arnold
- Cornelia Isabella Bargmann
- Wolfgang P. Baumeister
- Adriaan Bax
- Lewis W. Bernard
- Kenneth George Binmore
- Joel S. Birnbaum
- Mina J. Bissell
- Richard Blundell
- Robert F. Boruch
- Edouard Brezin
- Robert L. Bryant
- Mark A. Cane
- F. Stuart Chapin III
- David D. Clark
- John Allen Clements
- Joshua Cohen
- Lewis W. Coleman
- Rita Rossi Colwell
- Joan W. Conaway
- Ronald C. Conaway
- Bonnie Costello
- Shaun Robert Coughlin
- Sheldon H. Danziger
- Ann Douglas
- Richard Timothy Durrett
- Carol S. Dweck
- William S. Edgerly
- William L. Fash, Jr.
- James D. Fearon
- Frances Daly Fergusson
- Mark Charles Fishman
- James G. Fujimoto
- Robert Berj Gagosian
- Jonathan Galassi
- Catherine Gallagher
- William A. Gamson
- Alice Petry Gast
- Apostolos P. Georgopoulos
- Irma Gigli
- Linda Gordon
- Anthony Grafton
- Everett Peter Greenberg
- Robert M. Greenstein
- Theodore Groves
- Gustavo Gutierrez
- Brian Keith Hall
- Delon Hampton
- William V. Harris
- Joseph D. Harris
- Siegfried S. Hecker
- Brian M. Hoffman
- Steven Holl
- Michael J. Hopkins
- Amos B. Hostetter, Jr.
- K. N. Houk
- Albert James Hudspeth
- Anjelica Huston
- Keith Jarrett
- Jacqueline Jones
- Randy H. Katz
- Carlos E. Kenig
- William Kennedy
- Mary Bernadette Kennedy
- David A. Kessler
- Philip S. Khoury
- Susan Marie Kidwell
- Elliott Dan Kieff
- David A. King
- William E. Kirwan
- Philip S. Kitcher
- Herbert P. Kitschelt
- Mimi A. R. Koehl
- Edward W. Kolb
- Milan Kundera
- Leonard A. Lauder
- Ang Lee
- Anthony Lester
- Steven Levitt
- David Levering Lewis
- Charles M. Lieber
- Douglas N. C. Lin
- Michael Loewe
- Kenneth Marc Ludmerer
- Michael Lynch
- Mark J. Machina
- Iain William Mattaj
- Claire Ellen Max
- Renate Mayntz
- Peter McCullagh
- Bernard J. McGinn
- Harry Y. McSween Jr.
- Anthony R. Means
- Douglas L. Medin
- Georg Fritz Melchers
- Felix Mitelman
- John Hardman Moore
- William W. Murdoch
- William D. Nix
- Victor Nussenzweig
- Kenzaburo Oe
- Jerrold M. Olefsky
- David Woodley Packard
- Ariel Pakes
- Herbert Pardes
- Katharine Park
- Itzhak Perlman
- Elizabeth J. Perry
- John R. Perry
- Gregory A. Petsko
- Carl H. Pforzheimer III
- James Stewart Polshek
- Robert N. Proctor
- Wayne Proudfoot
- Matthew Rabin
- Bruce Redford
- Joseph J. Rishel
- Giacomo Rizzolatti
- Tina Rosenberg
- Ingrid D. Rowland
- Virginia Sapiro
- Fritz W. Scharpf
- George Chappell Schatz
- Klaus R. Scherer
- Sara Lee Schupf
- Rebecca J. Scott
- Steven M. Shavell
- Thomas E. Shenk
- Lee S. Shulman
- Charles Simic
- Anne-Marie Slaughter
- Bruce Michael Spiegelman
- Nicholas Canaday Spitzer
- Robert F. Sproull
- Peter John Stang
- Guy L. Steele Jr.
- David A. Strauss
- Michael P. Stryker
- Lawrence E. Sullivan
- Jacob Wilhelm Fredrik Sundberg
- William W. Tait
- Naoyuki Takahata
- Mark H. Thiemens
- Stephen Joel Trachtenberg
- Michael Traynor
- Yi-Fu Tuan
- Mark V. Tushnet
- Laura D'Andrea Tyson
- Ronald D. Vale
- Robert W. Vishny
- Peter Walter
- Timothy Douglas White
- John A. Whitehead
- Sue Hengren Wickner
- Clifford M. Will
- Ian Andrew Wilson
- Mark Brian Wise
- Thomas Adams Witten
- Irving Wladawsky-Berger
- Richard Vance Wolfenden
- Allen W. Wood
- Charles Wright

== 2003 ==
- Rolena Adorno
- Peter Courtland Agre
- Alfred V. Aho
- Thomas D. Albright
- Drew E. Altman
- Fred Colvig Anson
- Aloisio Araujo
- James Grieg Arthur
- William R. Atchley
- Dennis A. Ausiello
- Paul Auster
- Frederick M. Ausubel
- Phaedon Avouris
- Lloyd Axworthy
- Lawrence S. Bacow
- Allan I. Basbaum
- Philip Beachy
- Alain Berthoz
- Catherine Ann Bertini
- Carolyn R. Bertozzi
- J. Richard Bond
- Alan Paul Boss
- Henry E. Brady
- Thomas A. Brady, Jr
- William R. Brody
- Archie Brown
- John Browne
- James Jeffery Bull
- Kathryn Lee Calame
- Colin Camerer
- Peter Carey
- David Carrasco
- Paul M. Chaikin
- Martin Chalfie
- Uma Chowdhry
- William A.V. Clark
- David Charles Clary
- Vincent Paul Crawford
- Michael Cunningham
- Gretchen C. Daily
- Richard J. Davidson
- Percy A. Deift
- Michel Henri Devoret
- William Eric Dietrich
- Jennifer A. Doudna Cate
- James Economy
- Robert N. Eisenman
- Stephen Elledge
- Rochelle Easton Esposito
- Lawrence Craig Evans
- Paul G. Falkowski
- Larry R. Faulkner
- Hartry Field
- Martin Filler
- Eric Fischl
- Matthew P.A. Fisher
- Richard W. Fisher
- Joel L. Fleishman
- Perry Allen Frey
- William Henry Gates Sr.
- Bernd Giese
- Donald Philip Green
- Michael Eldon Greenberg
- Carol W. Greider
- Thomas C. Grey
- Peter Gruss
- Richard Hamilton
- John Mark Hansen
- Harry D. Harootunian
- Stanley M. Hauerwas
- Martin F. Hellwig
- Thomas English Hill, Jr.
- Geoffrey E. Hinton
- Jules Alphonse Hoffmann
- Peter Uwe Hohendahl
- Thomas C. Holt
- Paul Lyon Houston
- Stephen P. Hubbell
- Randall Gardner Hulet
- Linda Hutcheon
- Samuel Issacharoff
- Charles Johnson
- Iain M. Johnstone
- Boyan Jovanovic
- Kenneth L. Judd
- William Kahan
- Louis Kaplow
- Nicholas M. Katz
- Thomas Joseph Katz
- Robert A. Katzmann
- Paul Kellogg
- Anthony John Patrick Kenny
- Laura L. Kiessling
- Joseph L. Kirschvink
- Michael Lawrence Klein
- Leonard Kleinrock
- Thomas B. Kornberg
- Michael Kremer
- Robert Eugene Krumlauf
- Jeri Laber
- Donald Quincy Lamb, Jr.
- Hermione Lee
- Martin L. Leibowitz
- Frank Thomson Leighton
- Arthur Levitt, Jr.
- Judy C. Lewent
- Fred S. Licht
- Dan Littman
- Elizabeth F. Loftus
- Tanya Marie Luhrmann
- Neil MacGregor
- Ellen M. Markman
- Konrad Mauersberger
- Doug McAdam
- Andrew P. McMahon
- John J. Mearsheimer
- Silvio Micali
- Fergus Graham Burtholme Millar
- Sherrill Milnes
- Peter Bartlett Moore
- Robert F. Nagel
- Lutz Niethammer
- Sigrid Nunez
- Maynard V. Olson
- Julio Mario Ottino
- Jessie Ann Owens
- Stephen W. Pacala
- Craig Packer
- Benjamin Ingrim Page
- Henry Petroski
- S. George H. Philander
- Jerome B. Posner
- Geoffrey Keith Pullum
- Adrian Raftery
- George H. Rieke
- Helmuth Rilling
- R.G. Hamish Robertson
- Sharon Percy Rockefeller
- Janet Rossant
- David John Sainsbury
- Osvaldo E. Sala
- Michael J. Sandel
- Ed Parish Sanders
- Harry N. Scheiber
- Douglas W. Schemske
- Kay Lehman Schlozman
- Wilfried Schmid
- Alan Shapiro
- Cindy Sherman
- Rae Silver
- Samuel C. Silverstein
- Ralph D. Snyderman
- Patricia G. Spear
- Richard M. Stallman
- Mriganka Sur
- Larry William Swanson
- Alexander Sandor Szalay
- Guido Tabellini
- Hue-Tam Ho Tai
- Lynne Talley
- Kathleen C. Taylor
- Shelley E. Taylor
- Laurel Thatcher Ulrich
- William G. Unruh
- Ellen S. Vitetta
- Andrew Baruch Wachtel
- Marvalee H. Wake
- Arthur Weiss
- Zena Werb
- William Tobey Wickner
- Ellen Dudley Williams
- Thongchai Winichakul
- Niklaus Wirth
- Michael Witzel
- Lawrence Wolff
- Michael Wood

== 2004 ==
- Lilia A. Abron
- Guenter Ahlers
- Huda Akil
- David Aldous
- Armand Paul Alivisatos
- James E. Alt
- James L. Axtell
- Tania Ann Baker
- Abhijit Vinayak Banerjee
- Moungi G. Bawendi
- Peter Beak
- Mark Firman Bear
- Ann Beattie
- Steven V. W. Beckwith
- Arden L. Bement, Jr.
- Jonathan Bendor
- Charles L. Bennett
- Edward J. Benz Jr.
- Paul Franklin Berliner
- Ned Block
- Jean F. P. Blondel
- Philip Chase Bobbitt
- Gary G. Borisy
- Mary Cunningham Boyce
- Vladimir Borisovich Braginsky
- Joan W. Bresnan
- Marilynn B. Brewer
- Richard H. Brodhead
- Jeremy Israel Bulow
- Claude R. Canizares
- Thomas James Carew
- Marian B. Carlson
- Dipesh Chakrabarty
- Moses H. W. Chan
- Bernard Chazelle
- Carol T. Christ
- James H. Clark
- Yves Colin de Verdiere
- David Collier
- Michael A. Cook
- Murray S. Daw
- Philippe de Montebello
- Mark E. Dean
- Rodolfo Dirzo
- Alexander W. Dreyfoos, Jr.
- Catherine Dulac
- R. Lawrence Edwards
- Scott D. Emr
- Donald Max Engelman
- Bernard Lucas Feringa
- Andrew Z. Fire
- George Philip Fletcher
- Paul A. Fleury
- Carl Frieden
- William Arthur Galston
- Donald Emil Ganem
- Dedre Gentner
- Andrea Mia Ghez
- Loren Ghiglione
- Steven M. Girvin
- Herbert Gleiter
- Alvin Ira Goldman
- Jeffrey Ivan Gordon
- Michael J. Graetz
- Avner Greif
- Sten Grillner
- Leonard Gross
- Barbara J. Grosz
- David C. Grove
- Leonard P. Guarente
- Werner L. Gundersheimer
- Donald A. Gurnett
- Joel F. Handler
- Jeffrey A. Harvey
- Michael Hechter
- Bernd Heinrich
- Susan Hockfield
- Frances Degen Horowitz
- Steven E. Hyman
- Eric N. Jacobsen
- Guillermo Jaim Etcheverry
- James Larry Jameson
- Brian D. Joseph
- Takeo Kanade
- Roger E. Kasperson
- Anatole Katok
- Anselm Kiefer
- Jürgen Kocka
- Guy Laroque
- Edward D. Lazowska
- Ho Wang Lee
- Mark R. Lepper
- Bruce R. Levin
- Jay A. Levy
- Fang-Hua Lin
- Lucio Luzzatto
- Yuri I. Manin
- Brice Marden
- Donald Anthony Martin
- Manuel Martinez-Maldonado
- John F. McDonnell
- Curtis W. Meadows Jr.
- Wayne A. Meeks
- Thomas Wendell Merrill
- Paul Lawrence Modrich
- Richard G. M. Morris
- C. Dan Mote, Jr.
- Alfred H. Mueller
- Joseph R. Nevins
- Mark A. Noll
- Michael John Novacek
- Erin K. O'Shea
- Maurice Obstfeld
- Sharon Olds
- Norman Jay Ornstein
- Lyman Alexander Page, Jr.
- Thalia Papayannopoulou
- Gustavo Perez-Firmat
- Carl Phillips
- Janet Breckenridge Pierrehumbert
- Stuart L. Pimm
- William H. Pritchard
- William B. Quandt
- Peter A. Railton
- Linda Lea Randall
- Lisa Randall
- Gerhard Richter
- Loren H. Rieseberg
- Gene Ezia Robinson
- Christina Romer
- Nancy Lipton Rosenblum
- Gerald Rosenfeld
- Peter Jacob Rossky
- Ed Ruscha
- Donald G. Saari
- Henry Samueli
- Aziz Sancar
- Paul Spyros Sarbanes
- Sosale Shankara Sastry
- Mark A. Satterthwaite
- Henry Frederick Schaefer III
- Samuel Scheffler
- Norbert Schwarz
- Anne Firor Scott
- William H. Sewell, Jr.
- Stephen Skowronek
- Rogers M. Smith
- Patty Stonesifer
- Peter L. Strick
- Jean Strouse
- Subra Suresh
- Masatoshi Takeichi
- Anne M. Tatlock
- Gang Tian
- Judith Tick
- Joan Tower
- James Turrell
- Peter V. Ueberroth
- Graham C. Walker
- Douglas C. Wallace
- Nolan R. Wallach
- Bess B. Ward
- Robert H. Waterston
- Rubie S. Watson
- Timothy Endicott Wirth
- Diane P. Wood
- Michael Woodford
- Yu Xie
- George D. Yancopoulos
- Lai-Sang Young
- Mary Alice Zimmerman
- Maria T. Zuber
- Paul Sebastian Zuckerman
- Ellen Taaffe Zwilich

== 2005 ==
- Qais Al-Awqati
- John Leonard Anderson
- William Franklin Baker
- Jack M. Balkin
- Daniel Barenboim
- Barry Clark Barish
- Omer Bartov
- Jane A. Bernstein
- Truman F. Bewley
- John P. Birkelund
- Rebecca Blank
- David E. Bloom
- Yve-Alain Bois
- Daniel Boyarin
- William Bruce Bridges
- Richard Brilliant
- Sergey Brin
- Tom Brokaw
- Nancy E. Burns
- Guillermo A. Calvo
- Chen Yi
- James Samuel Clark
- Rodney J. Clifton
- John Henry Coatsworth
- Barry Spencer Coller
- Joseph Hurd Connell
- E. Gerald Corrigan
- Harvey Dale
- Victoria de Grazia
- Edward Francis DeLong
- Joseph Mark DeSimone
- E. J. Dionne, Jr.
- Christopher B. Donnan
- Nicholas Michael Donofrio
- Gideon Dreyfuss
- Herbert Edelsbrunner
- James Engell
- Susan Tufts Fiske
- Sheila Fitzpatrick
- Edith Flanigen
- Eric Mark Friedlander
- Jerome H. Friedman
- Fred H. Gage
- Zvi Galil
- Lynn Garafola
- David Ginsburg
- Alfred L. Goldberg
- Susan J. Goldin-Meadow
- Rebecca Goldstein
- Donald Graham
- Iva S. Greenwald
- M.R.C. Greenwood
- Jack D. Griffith
- John V. Guttag
- Niels Hansen
- Gilbert H. Harman
- Stanley R. Hart
- Robert Hass
- Alan Hastings
- Fumio Hayashi
- John E. Heuser
- Werner Hildenbrand
- Peter B. Hirsch
- John P. Hirth
- Michael Hofmann
- Robert Hollander
- John T. Irwin
- Judith Jamison
- David C. Jewitt
- Madeleine M. Joullie
- David Julius
- Elena Kagan
- Brewster Kahle
- Duncan McLean Kennedy
- David I. Kertzer
- Alice Kessler-Harris
- David Mark Kingsley
- William C. Kirby
- Paul David Klemperer
- Jeff Koons
- Laurence J. Kotlikoff
- Conrad Phillip Kottak
- Stephen C. Kowalczykowski
- Louis M. Kunkel
- Thomas G. Kurtz
- Tony Kushner
- Frederick K. Lamb
- Naomi R. Lamoreaux
- Charles Larmore
- Sylvia Ann Law
- Gregory Lawler
- Richard Borshay Lee
- Ronald Demos Lee
- Robert Legvold
- Keith E. Lehrer
- Alan I. Leshner
- Maya Ying Lin
- Richard Michael Locksley
- Gerhard Loewenberg
- Jay Lorsch
- Glenn D. Lowry
- Alexander Lubotzky
- Alison Lurie
- Allan Hugh MacDonald
- Trudy F. C. Mackay
- Catharine Alice MacKinnon
- Gerald Dennis Mahan
- Tak Wah Mak
- Robert Charles Malenka
- Andrew Robert Marks
- Rowena Green Matthews
- John Wilbur McCarter, Jr.
- John J. McCarthy
- Brenda Milner
- Ann S. Moore
- Mark Morris
- Stephen Edward Morris
- Eric J. Nestler
- Barbara Jane Newman
- Hiroshi Nikaido
- Daniel G. Nocera
- Michael Lester Norman
- Ralph George Nuzzo
- Peter Lee Olson
- Lawrence Page
- Alberto Palloni
- Thomas D. Petes
- Julia M. Phillips
- Dolores Rita Piperno
- Sidney Poitier
- Harold Vincent Poor
- Charles Dale Poulter
- Earl A. Powell III
- Robert L. Powell
- Robert Charles Pozen
- Francine Prose
- Anne Pusey
- Anna Marie Pyle
- Tom A. Rapoport
- Louis French Reichardt
- Harriet Ritvo
- Donald John Roberts
- Henry L. Roediger III
- Elizabeth Barlow Rogers
- Ned Rorem
- Robert I. Rotberg
- Linda Preiss Rothschild
- John Wallis Rowe
- Margarita Salas
- Richard P. Saller
- Robert J. Sampson
- John Thomas Sayles
- Norman J. Schofield
- Frederick A. O. Schwarz, Jr.
- Melvyn J. Shochet
- Thomas J. Silhavy
- Margaret C. Simms
- Barry Martin Simon
- Michael Ellman Soule
- Steven W. Squyres
- Janice Gross Stein
- Susan Stewart
- Gary Struhl
- Galen D. Stucky
- Oscar Tang
- David Anthony Tirrell
- Robert L. Trivers
- Michael Turelli
- Kamil Ugurbil
- Axel Ullrich
- Cumrun Vafa
- Peter van Inwagen
- Ajit P. Varki
- Peter K. Vogt
- Neil Wallace
- Stephen M. Walt
- Mark W. Watson
- Samuel Miles Weber
- Rüdiger Wehner
- David C. Weinstein
- Nancy Sabin Wexler
- Christian Wolff
- Ada Yonath
