= Seidman (surname) =

Seidman is a Jewish surname. Notable people with the surname include:

- David N. Seidman (born 1948), American materials scientist
- Dov Seidman (born 1964), American author and businessman
- Gay W. Seidman, American sociologist
- Harold Seidman (1911–2002), American political scientist
- Herbert Seidman (1920–1995), American chess player
- Jonathan Seidman, American professor
- Judith Seidman (born 1950), Canadian politician
- Lewis William Seidman (1921–2009), American economist
- Mike Seidman (born 1981), American football player
- Naomi Seidman, Jewish professor
- Ricki Seidman (born 1955), American politician
- Robert B. Seidman (1920–2014), American scholar
- Steven Seidman (born 1948), American sociologist and author

== See also ==
- Seidman (disambiguation)
