= Neva Makgetla =

South African economist

- Born: Neva Seidman; 1956 or 1957 (age 69–70); United States of America
- Occupations: Senior economist at Trade & Industrial Policy Strategies
- Spouse: Zeph Makgetla (m. 1977)
- Parent(s): Robert B. Seidman; Ann Seidman
- Relatives: Jonathan Seidman (brother); Anita Parkhurst (grandmother)

Academic background
- Education: Harvard University (AB); Hochschule für Ökonomie (PhD)

Academic work
- Discipline: Economics
- Main interests: Industrial policy, value-chain analysis, employment creation

Neva Seidman Makgetla (born 1956) is an American–South African economist who is currently attached to Trade & Industrial Policy Strategies, an independent think tank based in Pretoria. She rose to prominence as the head of the policy unit at the Congress of South African Trade Unions (Cosatu) between 2000 and 2006. She was a member of the National Executive Committee of the ANC, Cosatu's Tripartite Alliance partner, from 2019 to 2022.

During apartheid, Makgetla was an academic economist with close ties to the exiled African National Congress (ANC). She moved to South Africa during the democratic transition and subsequently became a key figure in debates about post-apartheid labour policy. Before her seven-year stint at Cosatu, she was an economist on the Reconstruction and Development Programme, both during the development of the policy and during its implementation through Jay Naidoo's ministerial office.

Elsewhere in the civil service, she has worked for the Department of Labour, the Department of Public Service and Administration, the Development Bank of Southern Africa, and the Presidency under Thabo Mbeki. Most recently, she was head of economic policy in the Department of Economic Development from 2010 until 2015, when she joined TIPS. Her primary economic interests are in industrial policy, value-chain analysis, and employment creation.

== Early life and career ==
Makgetla was born in 1956 or 1957 in the United States, though she was later naturalised as a South African citizen. She is Jewish. Her parents – legal scholar Robert B. Seidman and dependency theorist and economist Ann Seidman – were American academics who taught at several African universities. In 1973, she had her first encounter with the African National Congress (ANC) in Lusaka, Zambia. She became a secretary in the party's Lusaka office, working alongside Limpho Hani and Jackie Molefe.

Returning to the United States, Makgetla completed graduated with honours with a bachelor's degree from Harvard University in 1978. She undertook postgraduate studies in economics at the Hochschule für Ökonomie in East Berlin, where she completed a master's in 1980 and a PhD in 1982. After that, she spent a decade in academia, initially at the University of Zambia from 1983 to 1986 and later at the University of Redlands and elsewhere.

Her association with the ANC continued, and she worked for the party's economic policy department in Lusaka. During the democratic transition, she helped draft the Reconstruction and Development Programme (RDP), which became the ANC's flagship economic and social policy after it entered government in 1994. In the same period, she worked for the National Labour and Economic Development Institute (Naledi), a labour-aligned think tank.

== Post-apartheid career ==
=== Civil service ===
Under the ANC government from 1994, Makgetla worked in the RDP office, led by RDP Minister Jay Naidoo. Makgetla was chief director for fiscal policy in the office, where, according to Patrick Bond, she was the leader of Naidoo's "progressive flank" in subsequent disputes about the detail and implementation of the RDP. After the RDP office was disbanded in March 1996, Makgetla briefly served as director of research in the Department of Labour.

In 1997, she joined the Department of Public Service and Administration as deputy director-general for remuneration. In that capacity, she was chief negotiator for the state in public-sector wage bargaining. According to Makgetla, her position in the department become uncomfortable after Geraldine Fraser-Moleketi was appointed as Minister of Public Service and Administration in 1999: while Fraser-Moleketi appeared to have a mandate to "get tough" on the public-sector unions in order to reduce the public wage bill, Makgetla's critics said that she was "soft on labour", both in wage talks and on the matter of public-sector retrenchments, with some going so far as to accuse her of being a union "mole". Makgetla was replaced as chief negotiator later in 1999, during wage negotiations that ultimately led to a unilateral wage award and a strike.

=== Cosatu policy unit ===
Makgetla left the civil service in 2000 and became coordinator for fiscal, monetary, and public-sector policy at the Congress of South African Trade Unions (Cosatu), which was the largest labour federation in the country as well as the ANC's Tripartite Alliance partner. Now on the opposite side of public-sector wage negotiations, she criticised the government for "subordinating labour relations to a declining budget" and for falling victim to the "ideology of a contracting state and managerialism".

Amid deteriorating relations between Cosatu and the ANC government under President Thabo Mbeki, Makgetla was a prominent face of the union's attack on Mbeki's Growth, Employment and Redistribution (GEAR) programme, which had replaced the RDP; in 2001, she compared GEAR to a self-imposed structural adjustment programme and said that it was creating a "deep structural crisis", cutting social services while failing to create employment. She was also strongly associated with Cosatu's anti-privatisation campaign, with Minister of Public Enterprises Jeff Radebe reportedly identifying her as a key ideologue (though Radebe denied this). Some observers linked criticism of Makgetla to broader tensions about the putatively outsized influence of non-Africans and leftists in the Tripartite Alliance; the South African Democratic Teachers' Union, for example, said that the personalised focus on Makgetla was "racist".

=== Return to civil service ===
In 2006, Makgetla announced her impending departure from Cosatu, amid a broader exodus from the union that was perceived to be linked to Cosatu's support for corruption- and rape-accused presidential candidate Jacob Zuma. Although Makgetla initially said that she was leaving Cosatu to return to Naledi, it was announced later in 2006 that she had been appointed to a position in Mbeki's kitchen cabinet. In 2007, she joined the Presidency as chief director for sector strategies, and she served simultaneously as a special economic adviser to Deputy President Phumzile Mlambo-Ngcuka. Richard Calland said that her appointment was somewhat surprising as "she had previously been shunned for fear that she was too left wing".

After leaving the Presidency, Makgetla joined the Development Bank of Southern Africa, first as lead economist for research and information and then as lead economist for development planning and implementation. While in that role, in March 2010, she was appointed to the economic development advisory panel established by Ebrahim Patel to advise his Ministry of Economic Development on job creation, economic trends, and development matters. Later the same year, she left the Development Bank to accept a full-time position in Patel's department as deputy director-general for economic policy, a position which she held until 2015. Patel also appointed her to the panel he established to advise government on Walmart's major Massmart acquisition.

=== Independent research ===
In November 2015, Makgetla joined Trade & Industrial Policy Strategies (TIPS) as a senior economist. She managed the think tank's trade and industry programme. While at TIPS, she was involved in a number of high-profile policy initiatives. In 2018, Finance Minister Nhlanhla Nene appointed her to his nine-member VAT review panel, chaired by Ingrid Woolard and tasked with investigating options for making VAT in South Africa more progressive. The following year, she was appointed to the inaugural National Minimum Wage Commission, although the Business Day reported that organised business had opposed her appointment due to her former links to Cosatu. In October 2019, she was one of four individuals co-opted onto the ANC National Executive Committee, the party's top executive organ; she was a member until the committee's term ended in December 2022.

== Personal life ==
Makgetla married Sophonia "Zeph" Makgetla in 1977. They had met and fallen in love while she was in Lusaka on her gap year; he was an Umkhonto we Sizwe operative in exile and was appointed as an ambassador after the end of apartheid. They have two daughters: Tumi, who is a political scientist, and Anita, who is in advertising.
