= Lucia B. Rothman-Denes =

Argentinian-American microbiologist

Lucia Rothman-Denes
- Born: Lucia Beatriz Rothman-Denes
- Education: University of Buenos Aires; Leloir Institute
- Awards: Member of the National Academy of Sciences (2014)
- Scientific career
- Fields: RNA polymerases
- Workplaces: University of Chicago
- Website: mgcb.uchicago.edu/faculty/rothman-denes

Lucia Beatriz Rothman-Denes (born February 17, 1943) is an Argentinian American microbiologist who is the A. J. Carlson Professor in the Department of Molecular Genetics at the University of Chicago. She is known for studying the regulation of transcription and host interactions that occur during bacterial virus infection. She was elected to the National Academy of Sciences (NAS) in 2014.

== Early life and education ==
Rothman-Denes was born in Buenos Aires in 1943 to Boris and Carmen Rothman. She studied at the University of Buenos Aires and graduated in 1964 with a licenciada degree in chemistry. She remained there for her graduate studies, earning a PhD in biochemistry in 1967. She worked at the Leloir Institute. Rothman-Denes completed a postdoctoral fellowship at the National Institutes of Health. She also spent time at the University of California, San Diego with E. Peter Geiduschek.

== Research and career ==
In 1967, Rothman-Denes was appointed to the faculty at the University of Chicago. She was made a Full Professor in 1984, and the A. J. Carlson Professor in 2015. She studies how bacterial viruses impact the molecular processes within a host. She uncovered mechanisms of transcription regulation through DNA structural transitions. Rothman-Denes combines biophysical, biochemical and structural characterisation techniques to understand gene expression at the level of transcription. She is particularly interested in DNA-dependent RNA polymerase.

Rothman-Denes' current work considers the mechanism at the onset of an injection, when proteins and genomes are injected into a host. She is also working on the characterisation of viral-encoded products that inhibit the essential function of the host. She studies the target of these viral-encoded products in an effort to design new antibiotics. She served on the board of governors of the American Society for Microbiology from 2000 to 2003.

=== Awards and honors ===
- 2001 Elected to the American Academy of Arts and Sciences
- 2014 Elected to the National Academy of Sciences

Rothman-Denes holds several patents to protect her inventions, including novel RNA polymerases and transcription substrates.
