= William H. McClain =

American molecular biologist and academic

- Education: Iowa Wesleyan University; Purdue University
- Known for: Dissection of RNA-protein recognition
- Awards: Fellow, Jane Coffin Childs Memorial Fund for Medical Research; Research Career Development Award, NIH; Foundation Lecturer, American Society for Microbiology; Elected Fellow, American Academy of Arts and Sciences
- Scientific career
- Fields: Molecular biology
- Workplaces: University of Wisconsin-Madison
- Website: http://williamhmcclain.com/index.php

William H. McClain is an American molecular biologist and academic. He was the Halvorson Professor of Bacteriology and Molecular Biology, at the University of Wisconsin-Madison. McClain is a Fellow of the American Academy of Arts and Sciences, and, formerly, a Jane Coffin Childs Memorial Fund for Medical Research Fellow. He was a Board Member of the American Academy of Arts and Sciences, Midwest Center. McClain is a pioneer in the biological sciences known for the dissection of RNA-protein recognition primarily through genetic and biochemical means in bacteria.

== Career ==
Following his Doctoral degree with Sewell P. Champe, McClain worked with Sydney Brenner and Francis Crick. Subsequently, he joined the faculty of the University of Wisconsin-Madison in 1971 and served there as the Halvorson Professor of Bacteriology and Molecular Biology. His research students at the University of Wisconsin-Madison include Hyunsic Choi, Christine Guthrie, Gail P. Mazzara, Guy Plunkett, and Jonathan Seidman.

== Research ==
McClain has published 100 research articles focusing on tRNA structure and function. He has delivered invited lectures at international meetings. Since 1970, he received grants from National Institutes of Health (NIH).

=== Transfer RNA Acceptor Identity ===
McClain's computer analysis allowed him to identify nucleotides in tRNAs that determine these molecules’ acceptor specificities. His identification in 1988 of a helical tRNA irregularity set up by a G-U wobble base pair in the alanine system and again in 2002 was confirmed in 2014 by direct crystal structure analysis. In other studies, McClain demonstrated the importance of tRNA backbone-mediated interactions with synthetase in mediating molecular recognition conferring aminoacylation specificity.

=== Transfer RNA Biosynthesis ===
McClain found the surprising existence of precursors with multiple tRNA species. Producing the mature tRNAs involved another novelty as adding the 3'- CCAOH amino acid accepting ends was a prerequisite to ribonuclease P cleavage

He gave a seven-step pathway leading from transcribed DNA to RNA intermediates that accumulated in successions of mutant cells lacking germane processing enzymes and whose nucleotide sequences defined the ordered steps. In his paper published in 1975, he described three steps to convert a large precursor RNA into serine and proline transfer RNAs and deduced a part of the pathway leading to the formation of the 3'-CCAOH sequence in the transfer RNAs. Furthermore, he introduced simple helical substrates for an RNA enzyme and discussed the significance of the 3′-CCAOH nucleotide residues in processing helical and normal tRNA precursors.

=== Discovery of the rIIB Protein of T4 Bacteriophage ===
In the late 1960s, McClain discovered the rII B cistron polypeptide of phage T4, work that garnered the attention of Sydney Brenner and Francis Crick with whom he would join in Cambridge, England.

== Awards and honors ==
- 1990 - Halvorson Professor of Bacteriology and Molecular Biology, University of Wisconsin-Madison
- 1994 - Elected Fellow, American Academy of Arts and Sciences

== Bibliography ==
- McClain, W. H., Guerrier-Takada, C., & Altman, S. (1987). Model substrates for an RNA enzyme. Science, 238(4826), 527–530.
- McClain, W. H., & Foss, K. (1988). Changing the identity of a tRNA by introducing a GU wobble pair near the 3'acceptor end. Science, 240(4853), 793–796.
- McClain, W. H., & Foss, K. (1988). Changing the acceptor identity of a transfer RNA by altering nucleotides in a" variable pocket". Science, 241(4874), 1804–1807.
- McClain, W. H., Chen, YM, Foss, K, & Schneider, J. (1988). Association of transfer RNA acceptor identity with a helical irregularity. Science, 242(4886), 1681–1684.
- McClain, W. H. (1993). Rules that govern tRNA identity in protein synthesis. Journal of molecular biology, 234(2), 257–280.
- Varani, G., & McClain, W. H. (2000). The G• U wobble base pair. EMBO reports, 1(1), 18–23.
