= Gay W. Seidman =

American sociologist

- Known for: Comparative studies of workers' movements in Brazil and South Africa; transnational labor activism and human rights campaigns
- Awards: Honorable mention, American Sociological Association book award (2008)

Academic background
- Education: Harvard University (BA); University of California, Berkeley (MA, PhD)
- Thesis: Labour Movements in Newly-Industrialized Countries: South Africa and Brazil, 1960–1985 (1990)

Gay W. Seidman is an American sociologist and the Martindale Bascom Professor of Sociology at the University of Wisconsin–Madison. Her research examines labor movements, social movement unionism, transnational activism, gender and citizenship, and development, with a particular focus on comparative studies of Brazil and South Africa.

== Early life and education ==
Seidman was born in the United States but attended elementary schools in Ghana, Nigeria, Tanzania, and Zambia (where her parents, Robert B. Seidman and Ann Seidman, taught at various universities) before attending boarding school in the United States. She and her twin sister later attended Harvard University together. She earned a B.A. summa cum laude in Social Studies from Harvard University in 1978, where she was deeply involved with The Harvard Crimson, serving as the first woman president.

As an undergraduate, Seidman also participated in Harvard’s anti-apartheid divestment campaign, which her twin sister, Neva Seidman Makgetla, had helped launch. In 1986, Seidman joined an alumni campaign urging Harvard to divest from all businesses linked to apartheid, and was elected as the first petition candidate to the university’s Board of Overseers.

After graduation, Seidman taught English, history, and African studies in high schools in Swaziland and co-authored a history textbook used in newly independent Zimbabwe as well as a development studies textbook used in Botswana, Lesotho, and Zimbabwe. She later pursued graduate studies at the University of California, Berkeley, where she earned an M.A. in Sociology in 1982 and an M.A. in Demography in 1989. She completed her Ph.D. in Sociology in 1990 under the supervision of labor scholar Michael Burawoy. Her doctoral dissertation, titled “Labour Movements in Newly-Industrialized Countries: South Africa and Brazil, 1960–1985,” compared workers’ movements in the two countries.

== Academic career ==
Seidman joined the faculty of the Department of Sociology at the University of Wisconsin–Madison in 1990 and has remained there throughout her career, advancing to the rank of full professor and holding the Martindale Bascom Professorship. She has also held visiting positions at the University of Michigan (where she was tenured for a period) and the University of the Witwatersrand in Johannesburg.

Her teaching includes courses on the sociology of labor, development, and social movements in the Global South, as well as global social problems and comparative racial inequality.

== Research and publications ==
Seidman's scholarship centers on the emergence of social movement unionism, the role of labor in democratization processes, transnational campaigns for labor rights and human rights, and the gendered dimensions of citizenship and state formation, especially in post-colonial and post-apartheid contexts. She has also written extensively about boycotts and divestment campaigns, and about urban street protests in the 21st century.

As of July 2026, according to Google Scholar, her publications have been cited more than 3,787 times. Her 1994 book Manufacturing Militance received scholarly reviews in many journals, including the American Journal of Sociology and the International Review of Social History. Her 2007 book Beyond the Boycott compares independent labor monitoring schemes in South Africa, India, and Guatemala, exploring some of the tensions and challenges involved in transnational efforts to regulate working conditions along global supply chains.

=== Books ===
- Seidman, Gay W. (1994). Manufacturing Militance: Workers' Movements in Brazil and South Africa, 1970–1985. Berkeley: University of California Press. ISBN 978-0-520-08303-5.
- Seidman, Gay W. (2007). Beyond the Boycott: Labor Rights, Human Rights, and Transnational Activism. New York: Russell Sage Foundation. ISBN 978-0-87154-762-0.
- Burawoy, Michael; Seidman, Gay, eds. (2024). Engaging Erik Olin Wright: Between Class Analysis and Real Utopias. London: Verso Books. ISBN 978-1-80429-472-7.

=== Selected articles ===
- Seidman, Gay W. (1999). "Gendered Citizenship: South Africa's Democratic Transition and the Construction of a Gendered State". Gender & Society. 13 (3): 287–307. doi:10.1177/089124399013003002.
- Seidman, Gay W. (2003). "Monitoring Multinationals: Lessons from the Anti-Apartheid Era". Politics & Society. 31 (3): 381–406. doi:10.1177/0032329203254861.
- Seidman, Gay W. (2008). "Transnational Labor Campaigns: Can the Logic of the Market Be Turned Against Itself?". Development and Change. 39 (6): 991–1003. doi:10.1111/j.1467-7660.2008.00525.x.

== Awards and honors ==
Beyond the Boycott received an honorable mention for the American Sociological Association's book award in the Sociology of Labor section in 2008 and was the subject of author-meets-critics sessions at the ASA annual meeting and a symposium in the journal Labor History.

== Personal life ==
Seidman is married to Heinz Klug, a professor of law at the University of Wisconsin–Madison. They have two children.
