= Reginald Green (economist) =

American development economist (1935–2021)

- Born: Reginald Herbold Green; May 4, 1935; Walla Walla, Washington, US
- Died: October 16, 2021 (aged 86); Louth, Lincolnshire, United Kingdom

Academic work
- Discipline: Development economics; African studies; Pan-Africanism
- Institutions: Harvard University, University of Ghana, Institute of Development Studies

Reginald Herbold Green (May 4, 1935 – October 16, 2021) was an American development economist who focused on African economic issues. His research focus included studying the economies of eastern and southern Africa, South African Development Community (SADC), international organizations and aid disbursement, and the Economic Commission on Africa, specializing in poverty alleviation, development enablement, and economic liberalization.

His study for UNICEF of the economic impact of South Africa's apartheid policies on children in countries such as Angola and Mozambique was influential in stimulating western countries to put pressure on South Africa to end the apartheid regime.

== Early life ==
Reginald Herbold Green was born on May 4, 1935, in Walla Walla, Washington, to Marcia Herbold and Reginald Green. His father was a professor and a clergyman. Green studied at the Whitman College, a private liberal arts college in Walla Walla, and then went on to Harvard University, from which he received his doctorate in 1961.

== Career ==
Green started his career at the Economic Growth Center in Yale University and later at the University of Ghana and then at the Makerere University, a public university in Uganda. Between 1966 and 1974, he worked at the Treasury of Tanzania. During this time, he was also the advisor to Julius Nyerere, the first president of Tanzania, and also served as the honorary professor of economics at the University of Dar es Salaam, in the capital city of Tanzania. He became the professorial fellow at the Institute of Development Studies, a research institute at the University of Sussex in the United Kingdom, where he served until his retirement in 2000.

As a development economist, Green's focus was on studying the economies of eastern and southern Africa, specifically those of Tanzania, Mozambique, and Namibia. He also focused on studying the South African Development Community (SADC), an organization focused on socio-economic cooperation between 16 countries in Southern Africa. He also studied international organizations and aid disbursement, and the Economic Commission on Africa, specializing on poverty alleviation, development enablement, and economic liberalization.

Through the 1960s and early 1970s, Green was the advisor to Julius Nyerere, the first president of Tanzania. During the 1980s, he served as an economic advisor to the South West Africa People's Organisation (SWAPO), a liberation organization based in Namibia, and also served with the United Nations Institute of Namibia leading up to the country's independence in 1991.

Green's 1968 book, Unity or Poverty: The Economics of Pan Africanism, cowritten with economist Ann Seidman, emphasized the notion of pan-Africanism, and argued for development aid flowing into the countries to be linked to social and economic unity between the countries. The book was built on a paper that was published at the Cairo Conference of the Organisation of African Unity in 1964.

One of Green's most influential works was a study that he did for UNICEF in the 1980s. In a paper titled Children on the Front Line in 1987, he estimated that South Africa's apartheid-linked economic and social policies targeted at countries like Angola and Mozambique, had resulted in the death of more than two million children under the age of five. The study brought worldwide attention to the apartheid policies in the country. It was cited in the US Congress and helped drive changes in attitudes of some of the western countries to the South African apartheid regime. During this period, he also focused on studying the political economy of conflicts, conflict regions, and rehabilitation. His work continued to string together themes of poverty alleviation, conflict economics, and broad-based development.

Green served as an advisor to many developmental organizations including Economic Commission for Africa, the UNICEF, UNCTAD, WFP, ILO and the UNDP. He was also associated with the Southern African Development Community and had served as a consultant for the African Centre for Monetary Studies.

== Personal life ==
Green was married to Bliss Griffiths, a marriage that ended in a divorce. He moved to the United Kingdom in 1975, and in later life he lived in Lewes, East Sussex.

Green died on October 16, 2021, at Madeira House Nursing Home in Louth, Lincolnshire. He was aged 86.

== Select works ==
- Green, Reginald H. (1963). "Multi-Purpose Economic Institutions in Africa". The Journal of Modern African Studies. 1 (2): 163–184. doi:10.1017/S0022278X0000104X. ISSN 0022-278X. JSTOR 159027. S2CID 153538548.
- Green, Reginald H. (1964). "Toward African Economic Integration? Problems and Perspectives [Abstract]". African Studies Bulletin. 7 (4): 24. doi:10.2307/523288. ISSN 0568-1537. JSTOR 523288.
- Green, Reginald H. (1965). "Four African Development Plans: Ghana, Kenya, Nigeria, and Tanzania". The Journal of Modern African Studies. 3 (2): 249–279. doi:10.1017/S0022278X0002365X. ISSN 1469-7777. S2CID 154803689.
- Green, R. H.; Hymer, S. H. (1966). "Cocoa in the Gold Coast: A Study in the Relations between African Farmers and Agricultural Experts*". The Journal of Economic History. 26 (3): 299–319. doi:10.1017/S002205070006839X. ISSN 1471-6372. S2CID 153660064.
- Green, Reginald H. (1967). "U.N.C.T.A.D. and after: Anatomy of a Failure". The Journal of Modern African Studies. 5 (2): 243–267. doi:10.1017/S0022278X00019121. ISSN 0022-278X. JSTOR 159228. S2CID 153364129.
- Green, Reginald Herbold; Seidman, Ann Willcox (1968). Unity Or Poverty?: The Economics of Pan-Africanism. Penguin.
- Green, Reginald Herbold (1980), "Accumulation, Efficiency, Equity and Basic Human Needs", in Pajestka, Jozef; Feinstein, C. H. (eds.), The Relevance of Economic Theories, London: Palgrave Macmillan UK, pp. 88–116, doi:10.1007/978-1-349-16443-1_7, ISBN 978-1-349-16445-5
- Green, Reginald Herbold; Kadhani, Xavier (1986). "Zimbabwe: transition to economic crises, 1981–1983: retrospect and prospect". World Development. 14 (8): 1059–1083. doi:10.1016/0305-750X(86)90010-0.
- Green, Reginald Herbold (1986). "Hunger, poverty and food aid in Sub-Saharan Africa: Retrospect and potential". Disasters. 10 (4): 288–302. Bibcode:1986Disas..10..288G. doi:10.1111/j.1467-7717.1986.tb00603.x. PMID 20958641.
- Green, Reginald Herbold (1987), "Sub-Saharan Africa: Poverty of Development, Development of Poverty", in Clay, Edward; Shaw, John (eds.), Poverty, Development and Food, London: Palgrave Macmillan UK, pp. 78–111, doi:10.1007/978-1-349-09214-7_6, ISBN 978-1-349-09216-1
- Green, Reginald Herbold; Singer, Hans (1984). "Sub-Saharan Africa in depression: The impact on the welfare of children". World Development. 12 (3): 283–295. doi:10.1016/0305-750X(84)90064-0.
- Green, Reginald Herbold (1981). ""A Time of Struggle": Exogenous Shocks, Structural Transformation and Crisis in Tanzania". Millennium: Journal of International Studies. 10 (1): 29–41. doi:10.1177/03058298810100010401. ISSN 0305-8298. S2CID 144815031.
- Green, Reginald Herbold (1981). "Brandt on an end to poverty and hunger". Third World Quarterly. 3 (1): 96–103. doi:10.1080/01436598108419546. ISSN 0143-6597.
- Green, Reginald Herbold (1983). "'Things fall apart': The world economy in the 1980s". Third World Quarterly. 5 (1): 72–94. doi:10.1080/01436598308419680. ISSN 0143-6597.
- Green, Reginald H. (1988). "Ghana: Progress, Problematics and Limitations of the Success Story".
- Green, Reginald Herbold (1991). "Politics, power and poverty: Health for all in 2000 in the Third World?". Social Science & Medicine. 32 (7): 745–755. doi:10.1016/0277-9536(91)90300-2. PMID 2028269.* Green, Reginald Herbold (1992). "Southern Africa: that the people may be fed". Food Policy. 17 (6): 455–464. doi:10.1016/0306-9192(92)90077-B.
- Green, Reginald Herbold (1993). "The political economy of drought in Southern Africa 1991–1993". Health Policy and Planning. 8 (3): 256–266. doi:10.1093/heapol/8.3.256. ISSN 0268-1080.
- Green, Reginald (1993). "Calamities and Catastrophes: Extending the UN Response". Third World Quarterly. 14: 31–55. doi:10.1080/01436599308420312.
