= Glauco Tocchini-Valentini =

Italian molecular biologist

Glauco P. Tocchini-Valentini is an Italian molecular biologist. As of 2009, he was elected as a foreign associate of the National Academy of Sciences, affiliated with the National Research Council of Italy (CNR). In his forty plus years in molecular biology, he has published over 140 papers on topics like mutagenesis, RNA molecules, structure, function and evolution, disease models, neurodegenerative diseases, and cognitive disorders. He currently resides in Rome, Italy as director at the Institute of Cell Biology. He is also the coordinator for European Mouse Mutant Archive, also known as EMMA. Currently, he is actively advocating advancement in infrastructure for science buildings across Europe.

== Early life and education ==
Tocchini-Valentini graduated the University Rome La Sapienza in 1959, interested in producing special phosphates in order to synthesize RNA. He pursued his interests at the Karlsruhe Institute of Technology in Karlsruhe, Germany, where he became a radiobiologist in their Institute of Radiology. At the end of his fellowship, Tocchini-Valentini went on teach at the University of Chicago, where he published numerous papers on asymmetrical transcription in collaboration with Franco Graziosi, Peter Geiduschek, Robert Haselkorn, and Samuel Weiss. After leaving University of Chicago in 1996, he returned to Italy, where he is currently affiliated with the National Research Council of Italy.

== Research interests ==
Glauco Tocchini-Valentini's early research focused on demonstrating genetic transcription as an asymmetric process. His publication on findings of asymmetric synthesis of RNA in vitro concluded that the synthesis of mRNA and rRNA is asymmetric whereas DNA yielded symmetric synthesis. From there, he aided in isolating, characterizing, and discovering several enzymes involved in the transcription process, such as DNA and RNA polymerases, rDNA cistrons, and Typell DNA topoisomerase. Much of his work was characterized using various Xenopus laevis cell types, including oocytes, unfertilized eggs, and kidney cells; the characteristics of these amphibian cells and their enzymes were related to mammalian cells and their respective enzymes.

Tocchini-Valentini has also contributed to current understanding of enzyme-substrate rules, stemming from his publication on RNase P and endonuclease from Xenopus laevis cell types. He characterized the tRNA endonucleases of Archaea, finding three forms of tRNA endonuclease. His current research focus is using an archaeal endonuclease (MJ-EndA) to control splicing in both live mice and mice lines. This emergent technology, which can perform both cis- and trans-splicing, allows perturbations to be introduced at the RNA level, thus allowing more specific targeting in mRNA as well as other RNAs. More recently, his research focuses on improving phenotyping data by using "soft windowing." which use adaptive windows of time to include certain controls to result in better analysis across small variations in experiments. He is also involved in the Deep Genome Project, a project which focuses on sequencing all analogous genes in mice as humans in order to better understand disease models and mechanisms. Through phenotyping screens of these mice, genetic components of metabolism and auditory dysfunction has been identified.

== Patents ==
Tocchini-Valentini has filed several patents pertaining to RNA cleavage and recombination. The following two have been approved by the United States Patent and Trademark Office (USPTO): method of RNA cleavage and method of RNA cleavage and recombination.

In 2003, the RNA cleavage method first exposes the target molecule (not containing a tRNA structure) to a eukaryotic tRNA splicing endonuclease. This puts the molecule in the bulge-helix-bulge conformation, and cleavage occurs in this formation, resulting in cleavage products. The cleavage reaction can occur both in vitro and in vivo, and it is mainly used to demonstrate the presence of specific RNAs in samples. Using fluorescence resonance energy transfer (FRET), the target molecule can be labeled and fluorescence would be measured upon cleavage of the oligonucleotide.

In continuation of this previous patent, he filed a follow up patent in 2004, which was approved on August 20, 2013. As described previously, the RNA molecule is cleaved within the bulge-helix-bulge. As the target RNA molecule and the exogenous RNA molecule are treated with the correct ligase, RNA chimeras form. This results in the recombination of the target RNA and the exogenous RNA across the bulge-helix-bulge structure, thus this method can also be used for recombining RNA molecules in order to alter RNA function and hence gene expression.

== Awards and honors ==
Tocchini-Valentini was awarded the San Giacomo Della Marca Prize in 2007. The San Giacomo della Marca prize is awarded to an esteemed person originating from the Marche area.
