= Robert B. Seidman =

American scholar (1920–2014)

Robert B. Seidman (February 24, 1920 – April 3, 2014) was an American legal scholar, active in African liberation and democracy struggles, and Professor and then emeritus Professor of Law and Political Science at Boston University from 1974 to 2013.

== Background ==
Seidman was born and grew up in New York, USA. He attended the Ethical Culture Fieldston School (1931–1937). He graduated from Harvard College in 1942 (magna cum laude, highest honors), just months after the beginning of US involvement in the Second World War. He joined the United States Coast Guard but unexpectedly was seconded to the US Navy and to active service. He sailed in Arctic convoys from the United Kingdom, Iceland and North America to Murmansk in the Soviet Union, escorting merchant ships delivering supplies to the Soviet Union under the Lend-Lease program. As Lieutenant, in 1944 he commanded Landing Ship/Tank 767 (LST-767) in the Battle of Okinawa, landed his ship and off-loading craft and troops from Pearl Harbor. He graduated from Columbia Law School in 1948 and practiced law into the 1950s in Connecticut and New York.

In 1962 he went to Ghana with his wife and five children, supported by the Ford Foundation, to help the new nation develop post-colonial institutions. He lectured in law at the University of Ghana, becoming visiting professor. As a supporter of African unity with his wife Ann (an economist), he advised Kwame Nkrumah, Ghana's first President. He traveled widely in West Africa, across the former British and French colonies. After the 1966 coup against Nkrumah, he and his family were deported by the new regime, and he had already begun teaching at the University of Lagos, Nigeria. He became Professor of Law at the University of Wisconsin-Madison from 1966 to 1972 as Professor of Law, also undertaking a visiting posting to the University College of Dar es Salaam in Tanzania (1968–1970). He left Madison in the early 1970s, citing lack of opportunities for his wife Ann, and from 1972 to 1974 both of them worked in senior positions at the University of Zambia, and later in Zimbabwe. Seidman returned to the US and a permanent Professorship at Boston University Law School in about 1974, remaining there past retirement (1992) until 2013 when he was 93 years old. He was Fulbright Professor at Peking University in Beijing, 1988–1989 and Visiting Distinguished Professor of Law, University of the Witwatersrand in South Africa.

== Expertise ==
Seidman's expertise was in law and development, and particularly the use of democratic legislative tools as part of successful economic and political institutional reform for developing countries. He was a leading expert in legislative drafting, working in 30 countries. He advocated the use of law to construct institutional change that could redress embedded socio-economic inequalities. With his wife he founded the International Consortium for Law and Development (ICLAD) in 2004. They taught short courses in law and development and legislative drafting around the world. They helped draft constitutions for Namibia, Somalia, Iraq, and Afghanistan.

== Personal life ==
Robert Seidman married Ann Wilcox just after the Second World War, and they were together for 67 years. Ann and Bob Seidman had five children, some of whom are also academics: Jonathan Seidman (professor of genetics), Judy Seidman (artist and activist), Katha Seidman (artist and production designer), Gay Seidman (sociology professor) and Neva Seidman Makgetla (writer and former economics professor).

The Seidmans were among several families who established one of the first interracial planned communities on the East Coast of the US, at Village Creek in Norwalk, Connecticut in the 1950s, and some of their children were born there. Village Creek exists to this day.

== Recognition ==
- Coast Guard's Commendation Ribbon, 1945

== Publications ==
- Seidman, R.B. 1966. Sourcebook of the Criminal Law of Africa: Cases, Statutes and Materials. Sweet & Maxwell.
- Chambliss, W.J. and R.B. Seidman. 1970. Sociology of the Law: A Research Bibliography. Glendessary Press.
- Seidman, R.B. 1978. The State, Law, and Development. Croom Helm.
- Chambliss, W.J. and R.B. Seidman. 1971/1982. Law, Order, and Power. Addison-Wesley.
- Seidman, A. and R.B. Seidman. 1994. State and Law in the Development Process: Problem-Solving and Institutional Change in the Third World. Palgrave Macmillan.
- Seidman, R.B., A. Seidman and J. Payne. 1997. Legislative Drafting for Market Reform: Some Lessons from China. St. Martin's Press.
- Seidman, A., R.B. Seidman and T.W. Wälde (eds.) 1999. Making Development Work: Legislative Reform for Institutional Transformation and Good Governance. Kluwer Law International.
- Seidman, A., R.B. Seidman and N. Abeyesekera. 2001. Legislative Drafting for Democratic Social Change: A Manual for Drafters. The Hague: Kluwer Law International. [translated into ten languages]
- Seidman A., R.B. Seidman, P. Mbana and H.H. Li (eds.). 2006. Africa's Challenge: Using Law for Good Governance And Development. Africa World Press.

The Seidman Research Papers, numbering in the hundreds, are archived at Boston University.
