= Seidman =

Seidman may refer to:

- Seidman (surname), list of people with this name
- BDO Seidman, an American accounting firm
- Seidman College of Business, a college at Grand Valley State University
- Anglicized version of seiðmaðr, a male practitioner of Seid
