= Richard Locksley =

Richard Locksley MD
- Occupation: Infectious diseases
- Website: Profile on University of California, San Francisco website Profile on Sandler Asthma Basic Research Center website

Richard Locksley is a medical doctor, professor and researcher of infectious diseases, who pioneered approaches to study immunology. He is a professor of medicine and microbiology and immunology at the University of California, San Francisco School of Medicine, where he also serves as the director of the Sandler Asthma Basic Research Center. He is also an investigator for the Howard Hughes Medical Institute. He is a fellow of the American Academy of Microbiology. In 2018, he was inducted into the National Academy of Sciences for his work on immunology.

== Early life ==
Locksley graduated from Kent School in 1966. He received a Bachelor of Arts in biochemistry from Harvard College in 1970 and Doctor of Medicine from the University of Rochester in 1976. He completed his residency at University of California, San Francisco School of Medicine in 1980 and trained in infectious diseases at the University of Washington 1980-1983.
