= Robert L. Powell =

American political scientist (1956–2021)

Academic background
- Education: B.S., Mathematics, Harvey Mudd College; M.Phil., International Relations, University of Cambridge; M.A., PhD, Economics, University of California, Berkeley
- Thesis: Three essays in economics and international politics: nuclear deterrence theory; trade and a security dilemma; uncertainty and interest elasticity (1985)

Academic work
- Institutions: University of California, Berkeley

Robert Lowell Powell (July 7, 1956 – December 13, 2021) was a political scientist. He was the Robson Professor of Political Science at the University of California, Berkeley. In the field of international relations, he made influential contributions regarding the application of game theory to war and political violence.

== Early life and education ==
Powell earned his Bachelor of Science degree in mathematics from Harvey Mudd College before travelling to the United Kingdom for his Master's degree at the University of Cambridge. He returned to California in the 1980s for his second master's degree and PhD at the University of California, Berkeley.

== Career ==
Powell joined the political science faculty at the University of California, Berkeley in 1990 and published his first book titled Nuclear Deterrence Theory. He published his second book In the Shadow of Power: States and Strategies in International Politics in 1999, showing that costly conflict can result from large and rapid shifts in the distribution of power, which increased the severity of commitment problems. His most widely cited article was "War as a Commitment Problem."

In 2005, Powell was elected a Fellow of the American Academy of Arts and Sciences as someone who has "made preeminent contributions to their disciplines and to society at large." In 2012, he was honored by the National Academy of Sciences for his "development of sophisticated game theory models of conflict that shine light on the strategic dilemmas of nuclear deterrence." As the Robson Professor of Political Science, Powell was the co-recipient of the 2018 Berkeley Faculty Service Award.

== Selected publications ==
- Nuclear Deterrence Theory (1990)
- In the Shadow of Power: States and Strategies in International Politics (1999)
