= Daniel L. Rubinfeld =

American economist

- Born: Daniel Lee Rubinfeld

Academic background
- Education: Massachusetts Institute of Technology (Ph.D., 1972)

Academic work
- Discipline: Law and economics Microeconomics; Public economics
- Institutions: New York University School of Law; University of California, Berkeley; University of Michigan
- Awards: Center for Advanced Study in the Behavioral Sciences Fellow (1992–93); Guggenheim Fellowship (1994)

Daniel Lee Rubinfeld is an American economist specializing in public economics and law and economics. He is a professor of law at the New York University School of Law, as well as the Robert L. Bridges Professor Emeritus of Law and professor emeritus of economics at the University of California, Berkeley. He is the author of two textbooks: Microeconomics and Econometric Models and Economic Forecasts.

== Education and academic career ==
Rubinfeld was educated at Princeton University and the Massachusetts Institute of Technology. He joined the faculty of the University of Michigan in 1972 as an assistant professor of economics. He was promoted to associate professor of economics and law at the University of Michigan in 1977, and to full professor there in 1982. He became a faculty member at the UC Berkeley School of Law in 1983, where he was chair of the Jurisprudence and Social Policy program from 1987 to 1990 and from 1998 to 2000. He was the deputy assistant attorney general for antitrust in the United States Department of Justice from June 1997 to December 1998.

== Honors and awards ==
Rubinfeld was a Center for Advanced Study in the Behavioral Sciences fellow from 1992 to 1993, and a Guggenheim Fellow in 1994. He was elected to the American Academy of Arts and Sciences in 2001.
