= Christine Seidman =

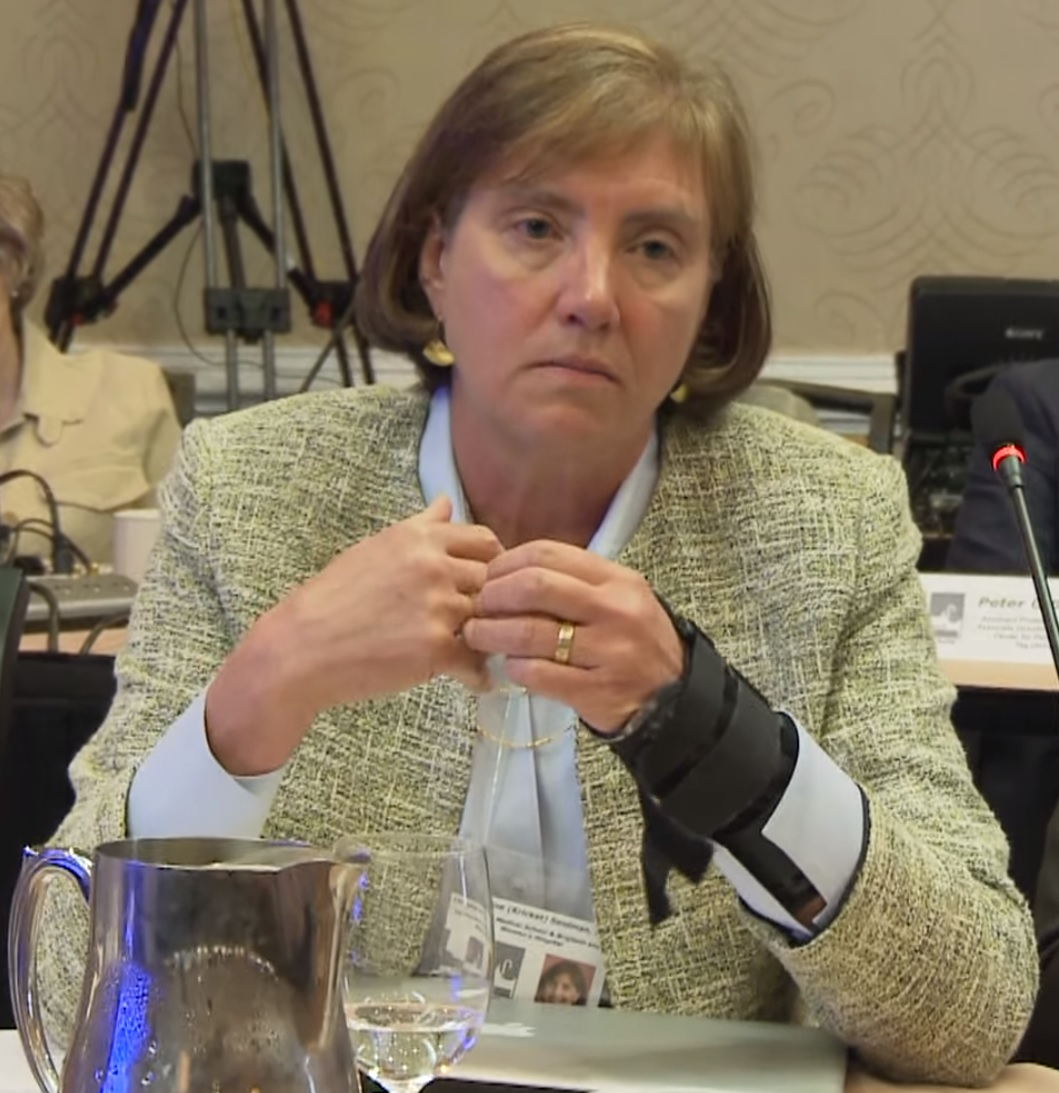
- Seidman at a National Human Genome Research Institute discussion in 2016
- Education: George Washington School of Medicine; Harvard University
- Spouse: Jonathan Seidman
- Children: 3
- Scientific career
- Fields: cardiology
- Workplaces: Harvard Medical School

Christine Edry Seidman is the Thomas W. Smith Professor of Medicine at Harvard Medical School and director of the Cardiovascular Genetics Center at Brigham and Women's Hospital. She operates a joint lab with her husband, Jonathan Seidman, where they study genetic mechanisms of heart disease. In recognition of her scientific contributions, she was elected as a fellow of the National Academy of Sciences, American Academy of Arts and Sciences, and National Academy of Medicine. In 2024, she was elected to the American Philosophical Society.

== Early life and education ==
Seidman was born in Kalamazoo, Michigan and grew up on Long Island. She earned a BS in biochemistry from Harvard University, and received her MD from the George Washington School of Medicine in 1978. She did an internal medicine residency at Johns Hopkins Hospital from 1978 to 1981 and a cardiology fellowship at Massachusetts General Hospital from 1982 to 1986.

== Career ==
In 1986, Seidman joined the faculty at Harvard Medical School as a lecturer in genetics. In 1997 she was promoted to full professor. She was the founding director of Cardiovascular Genetics Center and has led the institute since 1992. She is a co-founder of MyoKardia, a precision medicine company.

Seidman has been a Howard Hughes Medical Institute investigator since 1994. Seidman has authored more than 400 scientific publications. She also served on the Life Sciences jury for the Infosys Prize in 2017.

The Seidman lab researches the genetics involved in diseases such as hypertrophic cardiomyopathy, and was recognized for discovering the first genetic cause of congenital heart defects.

Beginning in 2009, the Harvard-MIT Program in Health Sciences and Technology has awarded the Seidman Prize for MD Research Mentorship in honor of her and her husband.

== Personal life ==
Seidman met her husband, Jonathan Seidman, while they were students at Harvard, and they were married in 1973. They operate a joint lab at Harvard and are both founding members of MyoKardia. In 2002, they shared the Bristol-Myers Squibb Award for Distinguished Achievement in Cardiovascular Research. They have three children.

== Awards ==
- 1992 Elected to the American Society for Clinical Investigation (ASCI)
- 1999 Elected to the National Academy of Medicine
- 1999 Elected to the American Academy of Arts and Sciences
- 2000 ASCI Stanley J. Korsmeyer Award
- 2002 Bristol-Myers Squibb Award for Distinguished Achievement in Cardiovascular Research
- 2003 Distinguished Scientist Award from the American Heart Association
- 2005 Elected to the National Academy of Sciences
- 2019 Vanderbilt Prize in Biomedical Science
