= John Hildebrand =

American neuroscientist

John G. Hildebrand is an American neuroscientist, currently Honors Professor and Regents Professor Emeritus at University of Arizona, and has been elected as Fellow of the American Academy of Arts and Sciences, International Society for Neuroethology, Royal Entomological Society of London, American Association for the Advancement of Science and Entomological Society of America, awarded an honorary degree by Universitá degli Studi di Cagliari and named Einstein Professor at Chinese Academy of Sciences.

== Education ==
John Hildebrand graduated from Belmont (Massachusetts) High School in 1960. He earned his baccalaureate degree magna cum laude in Biology at Harvard University in 1964 and his Ph.D. in Biochemistry at Rockefeller University in 1969 He was elected to the American Philosophical Society in 2014.

== Career ==
Hildebrand entered the field of Neurobiology in 1969 as a Helen Hay Whitney Foundation Postdoctoral Research Fellow in the Department of Neurobiology at Harvard Medical School in the laboratory of Professor Edward A. Kravitz. In that department, he advanced from Instructor (1970-1971) to Assistant Professor (1972-1976) and finally Associate Professor (1977-1980) of Neurobiology. In 1980 he accepted an appointment as Professor of Biological Sciences at Columbia University in New York City.

In 1985 he joined the University of Arizona in Tucson as the founding Director of a new Division of Neurobiology in the Arizona Research Laboratories. The Division became the Department of Neuroscience in the College of Science in 2009, with Hildebrand as its Head until 2013. In 2022, he retired from the faculty.

== Research ==
Hildebrand’s undergraduate research, with Professors John H. Law and Konrad E. Bloch, dealt with the structure of phospholipids in bacteria and resulted in his first publication in 1964. His doctoral thesis research, advised by Professors Leonard B. Spector and Fritz A. Lipmann, provided evidence that succinyl phosphate is a transient intermediate in the substrate-level phosphorylation reaction, catalyzed by the enzyme succinyl-CoA synthetase, in the Citric Acid Cycle of bacteria (Escherichia coli).

Since 1969 his research has focused on sensory neurobiology and neuroethology of experimentally favorable arthropods. First, working with lobsters (Homarus americanus), he led an effort that identified acetylcholine as a sensory neurotransmitter. Since 1972, his multidisciplinary research with his coworkers has combined neurophysiological, behavioral, chemical-ecological, anatomical, molecular and developmental approaches in studies of the olfactory system in insects (mainly the giant sphinx moth Manduca sexta). The goal of this research has been to uncover structural, developmental, and functional principles that may apply to other nervous systems, including those of vertebrate animals. Moreover, this work on Manduca aims to illuminate the olfactory bases of behaviors of other insects, both harmful and beneficial, that impact human health and welfare. He has studied the biology and behavior of Triatomine (“kissing”) bugs living in the Sonoran Desert of Arizona and in South America (where they are vectors of Chagas Disease); and the functional organization of neurosecretory systems.

== Honors and awards ==
- Fellow, The World Academy of Sciences (2022)
- Fellow, International Science Council (2022)
- Elected Corresponding Member, Brazilian Academy of Sciences (2019)
- Wigglesworth Memorial Award & Lectureship, Royal Entomological Society, London (2016)
- Elected Member, American Philosophical Society (2014)
- Elected International Secretary, National Academy of Sciences (2014)
- Honorary Fellow, Royal Entomological Society of London (2012)
- Elected Councilor, National Academy of Sciences (2012)
- Max Mozell Award for Outstanding Achievement in the Chemical Senses (2012)
- Foreign Member, Royal Norwegian Society of Sciences and Letters (2011)
- Fellow, Entomological Society of America (2008)
- Einstein Scholar, Chinese Academy of Sciences (2008)
- Elected Member, National Academy of Sciences (2007)
- Silver Medal, International Society of Chemical Ecology (2006)
- Elected Member, American Academy of Arts and Sciences (2001)
- Laurea honoris causa, Universitá degli Studi di Cagliari, Italy (2000)
- Foreign Member, Norwegian Academy of Science and Letters (1999)
- Elected Member, German National Academy of Sciences ‘Leopoldina’ (1998)
- Humboldt Research Award, Alexander von Humboldt-Stiftung, Germany (1997)
- President, International Society for Neuroethology (1995-1998)
- R.H. Wright Award in Olfactory Research (1990)
- Fellow, American Association for the Advancement of Science (1986)
