= Jack Dixon (scientist) =

American biologist

Jack Dixon is the Distinguished Professor of Pharmacology, Cellular & Molecular Medicine, Chemistry & Biochemistry at the University of California San Diego School of Medicine.

== Early life and education ==
Dixon was born in 1943. He attended the University of California, Santa Barbara, where he earned a PhD in 1971. He also studied at UC Los Angeles and UC San Diego.

== Career ==
Dixon joined the faculty of Purdue University in 1973 where he became the Wiley Professor of Biochemistry. He then worked at the University of Michigan, where he became the chairman of the department of biological chemistry and was the Minor J. Coon Professor of Biological Chemistry. In 2003 Dixon went to UC San Diego, where he became dean for scientific affairs and professor in the department of pharmacology. Three years later he accepted the position of vice president and chief scientific officer at the Howard Hughes Medical Institute, and served there from 2007 until 2013. In July 2013 he went back to laboratory work and university work full time at UCSD.

== Awards and honors ==
Dixon was elected to the National Academy of Sciences in 2000, in Biochemistry. He received the William Rose and Merck Awards (American Society for Biochemistry and Molecular Biology); was elected to the American Philosophical Society and is a Foreign Member of the Royal Society. He is also a member of the Institute of Medicine.

== Selected publications ==
- Liu X, Xiao W, Zhang Y, Wiley SE, Zuo T, Zheng Y, Chen N, Chen L, Wang X, Zheng Y, Huang L, Lin S, Murphy AN, Dixon JE, Xu P, et al. Reversible phosphorylation of Rpn1 regulates 26S proteasome assembly and function. Proceedings of the National Academy of Sciences of the United States of America. PMID 31843888 DOI: 10.1073/pnas.1912531117 (2019)
- Banerjee S, Wei T, Wang J, Lee JJ, Gutierrez HL, Chapman O, Wiley SE, Mayfield JE, Tandon V, Juarez EF, Chavez L, Liang R, Sah RL, Costello C, Mesirov JP, Dixon JE, et al. Inhibition of dual-specificity tyrosine phosphorylation-regulated kinase 2 perturbs 26S proteasome-addicted neoplastic progression. Proceedings of the National Academy of Sciences of the United States of America. PMID 31754034 DOI: 10.1073/pnas.1912033116 (2019)
- Gerson-Gurwitz A, Worby CA, Lee KY, Khaliullin R, Bouffard J, Cheerambathur D, Oegema K, Cram EJ, Dixon JE, Desai A. Ancestral roles of the Fam20C family of secreted protein kinases revealed in . The Journal of Cell Biology. PMID 31541016 DOI: 10.1083/jcb.201807041 (2019)
