= Osvaldo Sala =

Ecologist

- Born: Argentina
- Education: The University of Buenos Aires (BS), Colorado State University (MS, Ph.D.)
- Known for: Research generating projected changes in global biodiversity, and research investigating the response of arid ecosystems to climate change
- Scientific career
- Fields: Ecology, Global Change
- Workplaces: Arizona State University, Brown University, Cornell University, Imperial College, Stanford University, Colorado State University, The University of Buenos Aires
- Website: https://sala.lab.asu.edu/

Osvaldo Sala is an ecologist and educator at Arizona State University, where he is the Julie A. Wrigley, Regents and Foundation Professor and the Founding Director of the Global Drylands Center, as well as founder of the Sala Lab. He is known for his research on how global change affects the functioning of global ecosystems and their biodiversity, with a focus on drylands.

Sala's work has been cited more than 73,000 times in scientific publications, including his article in Science, titled Global Biodiversity Scenarios for the Year 2100, which has been cited more than 12,000 times. Recently, Sala and University of New South Wales Professor David Eldridge launched a new journal published by Cambridge University Press, entitled Drylands, which serves as a hub for trans-disciplinary studies of drylands.

== Early life and education ==
After completing an undergraduate program at the University of Buenos Aires, Sala continued his education at Colorado State University in Fort Collins, where he earned both his MS and Ph.D. in Ecology.

== Career ==
Before Sala's work at Arizona State University, he worked at Brown University as the Sloan Lindermann Distinguished Professor of Biology, where he founded and directed the Environmental Change Initiative and taught as Director of the Center for Environmental Studies (a distinguished position/title). Sala also worked at Stanford University as a Guggenheim Fellow, as the Andrew D. White Professor-at-Large, Cornell University and as a visiting scientist at Imperial College in Silwood Park (UK). He started his career as a Professor Ecology at his alma mater, the University of Buenos Aires in Argentina.

== Awards and honors ==
Sala was elected as a Member of the American Academy of Arts and Sciences, the National Academy of Sciences of Argentina, and the National Academy of Exact, Physical and Natural Sciences (ANCEFN) in Argentina. He was elected as Fellow of the Guggenheim Foundation, of the Ecological Society of America, the American Geophysical Union, and the American Association for the Advancement of Science, and Honorary Member of Asociación Argentina de Ecología.

== Research and publications ==
As of November 2025, Sala has co-authored over 260 peer-reviewed publications and his work has been cited more than 73,000 times as confirmed by Google Scholar. Since 2022, Sala has published more than 30 studies, spanning across several scientific areas, including drylands, global change, and ecology.

Drylands have been the primary focus of his research. Drylands occupy 40% of the terrestrial surface, represent home for 30% of the human population and host 50% of the global livestock. In addition, they account for most of the inter-annual variability of the global carbon cycle. Sala has studied the major drivers of arid ecosystems, looking at the effects of precipitation amount and their inter-annual variability. He is known for his large-scale, rain-out shelters that simulate future climate conditions.

Global change has been another subject area of Sala's work. For example, early in his career, when scientists and society were singularly focused on climate change, he published in Science the first scenario for biodiversity change for the year 2100, which has been cited more than 12,000 times. He also participated in multiple global-change syntheses, from the Intergovernmental Panel on Climate Change (IPCC) to the Millennium Ecosystem Assessment that have had significant impact on policy.

Ecology is another field to which Sala has contributed, combining experimentation, simulation modeling and synthesis of existing data. Sala's research is known for investigating topics that have received less attention but have the potential to change paradigms. For example, Sala and collaborators studied the effects of woody plant encroachment at the global scale and evaluated their impact on livestock production. They reported that the effect was modulated by socioeconomic conditions. Similarly, when the emphasis of climate change studies was on effects of changes precipitation and temperature, Sala focused on the effects of increased climate variability. He has conducted field experiments, simulation models, and data synthesis that brought about a new way of understanding the effects of climate change, while also leading the field of impacts of climate variability.

== Academic leadership ==
Sala 's international leadership positions includes serving terms as President of the Scientific Committee on Problems of the Environment (SCOPE), serving as a contributor to the Millennium Ecosystem Assessment and to the Intergovernmental Panel on Climate Change, and providing his expertise to the International Geosphere-Biosphere Program. He also served as President of the Ecological Society of America (the largest scientific organization of ecologists in the world with approximately 10,000 members), becoming the first Latin American and Hispanic scholar to lead the society. In Latin America, Sala was President of the Ecological Society of Argentina and the Latin American Association of Botany, which received the Tyler Prize under his leadership.

He is currently a member of the National Academies Committee that oversees the U.S. Global Change Research Program, which encompasses 15 national agencies and directs most U.S. research efforts on this topic. In addition, he serves on a committee of the National Academies of Sciences, Engineering and Medicine that has been tasked to assess the environmental effects of nuclear war.

Sala recently launched a new journal with University of New South Wales Professor David Eldridge published by Cambridge University Press, entitled Drylands. The objective of the journal is to serve as a hub of trans-disciplinary studies for drylands.
