= Anita Parkhurst Willcox =

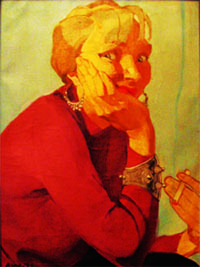
- Anita Parkhurst Willcox, self-portrait, oils, 1936
- Born: Anita Parkhurst; 1892; Chicago, Illinois
- Died: 1984 (aged 91–92); Norwalk, Connecticut
- Known for: Painting, Illustration
- Spouse: Henry Willcox (m. 1918)

Anita Parkhurst Willcox (1892–1984) was an American artist, feminist and pacifist. Her career as a graphic illustrator was interrupted by 15 months spent entertaining the troops in World War I, which left her passionately anti-war. During the 1920s, she gained fame for drawing "the New American Woman" image, but this contradicted her personal experiences as wife and mother. By the 1930s, she drew images that reflected her own life and beliefs. She was inspired by Gandhi's non-violence, and Mao's China; she met rejection and censorship during the McCarthy era. Despite this, she continued painting until her death in 1984.

== Early life ==
Magazine illustration by Anita Parkhurst (Willcox) 1916

Anita Parkhurst Willcox was born in Chicago, in 1892. She studied at the Chicago Art Institute from 1909 to 1913, learning classic drawing; but also studying mural-painting with John W. Norton. While a student, she began her commercial art career drawing illustrations of hats for Gages, the largest millinery company in the United States. She then moved to New York City, where she worked as a graphic artist and commercial illustrator, initially sharing a studio with Neysa McMein. Between 1913 and 1929, her commercial graphics included covers for Saturday Evening Post, Colliers, Every Week, Fashion Art, McCalls, and Screenland; posters for the YMCA, and numerous advertising illustrations. She signed her commercial work throughout this period with her maiden name, "Anita Parkhurst".

In New York, Willcox joined the social and intellectual group that after 1919 formed the Algonquin Round Table. (Willcox was an occasional participant in this group during the 1920s). She studied art briefly with George Bellows and Robert Henri (called the "Ashcan School" of art), but left after they objected to her "classic" drawing style. She married engineer Henry Willcox in 1918.

== Entertaining troops, World War I ==
Willcox in canteen at Amanty, France, with First American army, 1918

In 1918, two weeks after her marriage, Willcox went to France, to work with the YMCA to support American troops. She worked in a canteen stationed with the American First Division army during the Second Battle of the Somme (1918) in March 1918, then in the Gondecourt sector. With artist Neysa McMein and Jane Bullard, she developed and performed a vaudeville show which toured the troops on the front lines. Willcox and McMein also painted elephants on an observation balloon and artillery guns. She remained with the US army when it entered Germany, returning to New York in March 1919. These experiences made her a committed pacifist.

== "New American Woman" image ==
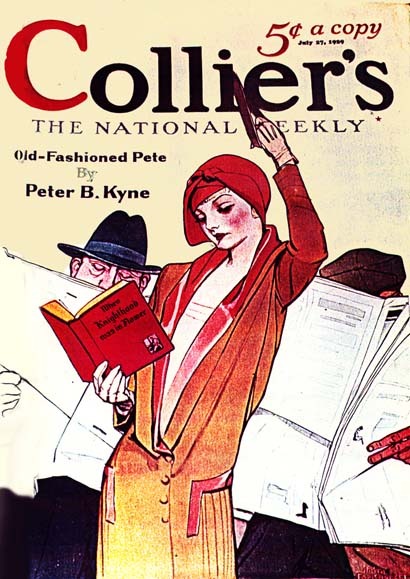
Colliers' cover by Anita Parkhurst (Willcox) 1929

After the war, Willcox resumed both her commercial art career in New York, and her married life. She became known for creating the "New American Woman" image – idealized pictures of women who were young, beautiful, fashionable, invariably white and economically successful. A feature newspaper article by Thompson Feature Services in 1921 reads: "The name of Anita Parkhurst is signed with greater frequency than that of any other artist . . .her work has a certain touch."

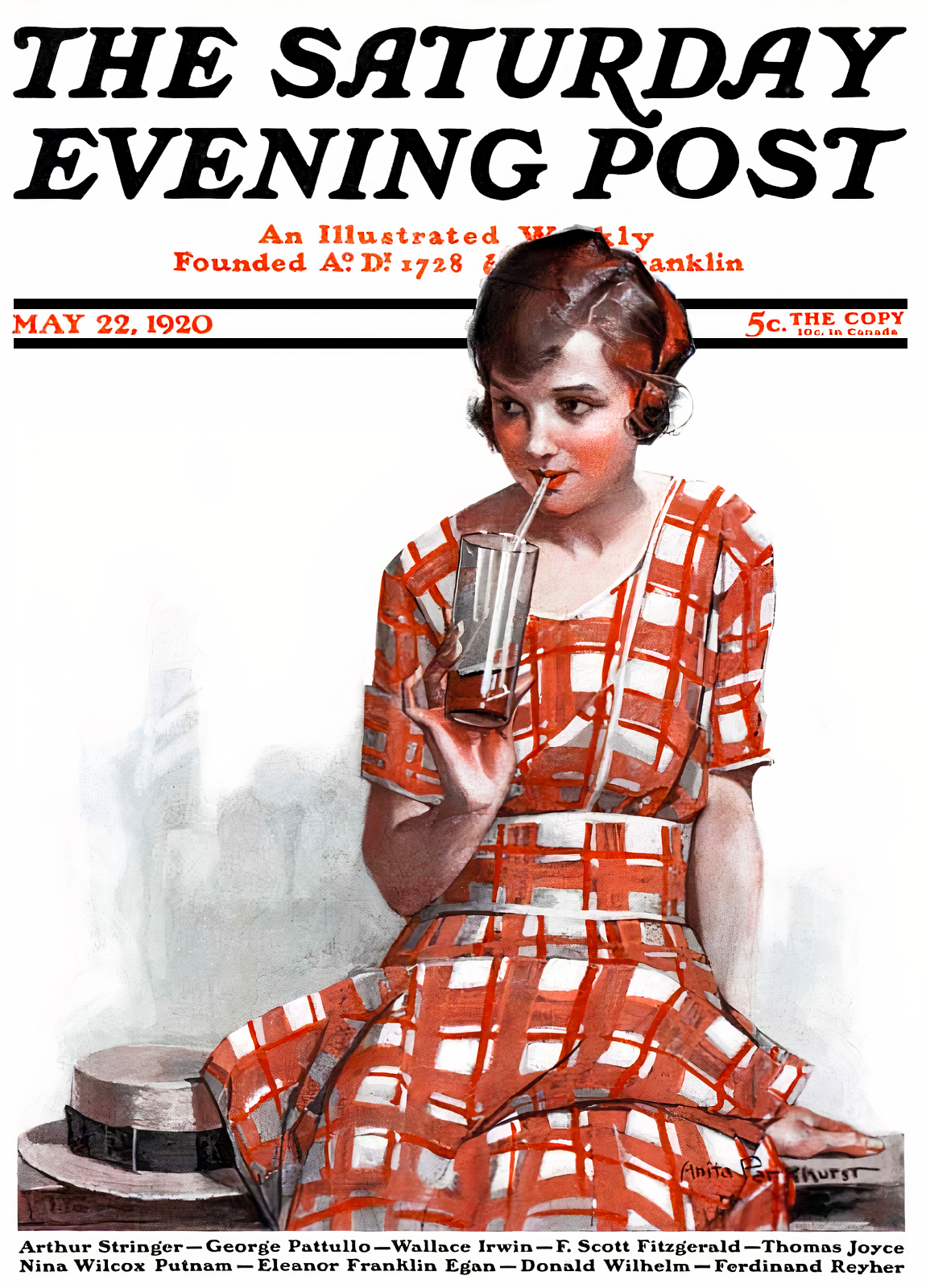
Saturday Evening Post cover, Anita Parkhurst (Willcox), 1921

== Conflicts between art career and gender roles ==
Between 1921 and 1926 Willcox gave birth to four children; she adopted a fifth in 1930. In 1923, following the birth of her third child, Willcox spent six months in bed with puerperal fever (childbirth fever). This led her to question the contradictions between the idealized images she produced, and the actualities of women's lives.

In 1925, Willcox wrote a book called "Between Jobs and Babies", exploring the changing nature of women's roles in industrial society. Leading women academics responded positively; Edith Stern, reviewing the book for Boni and Liveright, commented: "This is exactly the book I have wanted to have written." Despite the reviews, Willcox was unable to find a publisher.

Arguing that the idealized "pretty girls" she drew for commercial illustration were "socially pernicious", Willcox quit her career as a commercial artist.

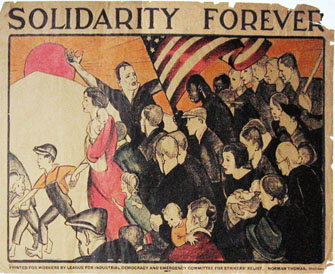
League for Industrial Democracy poster by Anita Willcox, 1932

== Towards gendered social realism ==
From 1928, Willcox sought to create art that captured her own experiences and perceptions. In 1930, she studied briefly with John Sloan at the Art Student's League. She traveled extensively, sketching scenes, events, and people around her. She did not attempt to position this artwork within the "art world", and made few attempts to hold gallery exhibitions. All of her work from this period on is signed "Anita Willcox", or "AW".

During the Depression, Willcox designed posters and graphics for Norman Thomas' League for Industrial Democracy, and for Masses magazine. She drew caricatures for Colliers of AFL leader W. Green, and John Lewis of the CIO.

== Against all wars ==
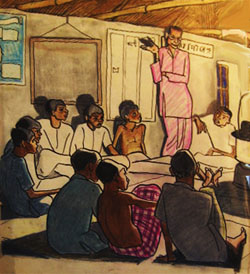
Sketch by Anita Willcox of peace conference at Mahatma Gandhe's ashram, Savagram, India, 1949

A committed pacifist, Willcox saw World War II as incomprehensible. She wrote in 1939: "I am paralyzed, clinging to bare reason to find a pattern, any pattern, that I can accept." Her depression was compounded by accidental carbon monoxide poisoning in 1940. For the next few years, she struggled to make any art, painting portraits of friends, and learning silkscreening.

Towards the end of World War II, she drew posters for Americans United for World Organisation, promoting the formation of the United Nations, and calling for an end to all wars. She publicly condemned the Korean War, and nuclear weapons.

In 1949 Willcox traveled through India. Her sketches record the First All India Conference held in Jaipur after the end of British rule; and a peace conference at Sevagram, Mahatma Gandhi (Mohandas Karamchand Gandhi)'s ashram, on the first anniversary of his assassination.

== Harassment from McCarthyism ==
In 1950, Anita and Henry Willcox, with three of their five children, founded a community in Norwalk, Connecticut called Village Creek. Conceived as a haven from racism, the Cold War, and McCarthy era red-baiting, Village Creek became the first interracial cooperative on the Eastern seaboard of the United States. Village Creek today comprises some sixty houses; in 2010 it was declared a National Historical Monument.

In 1952 Anita and Henry Willcox represented the Quakers at the Asia and Pacific Rim Peace Conference in Peking China. Willcox sketched delegates to the conference. Afterwards she traveled throughout the People's Republic of China. Meeting Anna Louise Strong led to extensive correspondence which laid the basis for Strong's newspaper column in the US, Letter from China.

Anita Parkhurst Willcox, Cartoon of generals and McCarthy-era politicians, 1953

Following this trip, the US State Department confiscated the Willcox's passports. The subsequent court case (a class action that included singer Paul Robeson) led to the 1958 Supreme Court ruling that the State Department cannot withhold a passport because of a citizen's beliefs or associations. (During the 1950s, when Robeson was unable to perform in public venues, he practiced on the piano in the Willcox house in West Greenwich.)

Willcox became a target for McCarthy era censorship. At aged 70, she was called to testify before Eastland Committee (both for attending the China conference, and as the person who funded the legal defence of Harvey Matusow, an FBI informer jailed for publicly admitting perjury as a state witness against "communist" trade union officials). Publicity around this meant she was unable to find a publisher for her book about India, and a Norwalk elementary school refused to take donated murals depicting Norwalk Harbor in the 17th century (the school accepted and hung the mural panel in 1977). Henry Willcox, her husband, a professional engineer and president of Willcox Construction Company, was expelled from the company he himself had founded.

Throughout the 1960s and 1970s, Willcox continued to travel and paint throughout the world. She died in Village Creek in 1984.

== Museum collection ==
- Guggenheim, New York City

== Public murals ==
- Chicago park buildings (ceiling, done in 1913)
- University of Ghana, Legon, Ghana; Law School Library (1964)
- Church, Norwalk Connecticut (1957)

== See also ==
- List of peace activists

== Sources ==
- One Woman: sketches/diaries/letters/notes/ fragments from Anita Parkhurst Willcox, ed. J.A. Seidman, Createspace, 2010
- Entertaining the American Army the American Stage and Lyceum in the World War, by Evans, James W. And, Harding, Captain Gardner L.; Illustrated by Neysa McMein, Anita Parkhurst, Ethel Rundquist, 1921; now available as an [www.ebooksread.com/.../1-entertaining-the-american-army-the-american-stage-and-lyceum-in-the-world-war-nav.shtm]e-book & reprint
- Deadly farce: Harvey Matusow and the informer system in the McCarthy era, by Robert M. Lichtman, Ronald D. Cohen, University of Illinois Press, Urbana, Il, 2004.
- The Great Fear, The Anti-Communist purge under Truman and Eisenhower, by David Caute, Simon and Schuster, 1978
