= Peter Dallos =

Former Northwestern University professor, currently a sculptor

Peter Dallos (born November 26, 1934) is the John Evans Professor of Neuroscience Emeritus, Professor Emeritus of Audiology, Biomedical Engineering and Otolaryngology at Northwestern University. His research pertained to the neurobiology, biophysics and molecular biology of the cochlea. This work provided the basis for the present understanding of the role of outer hair cells in hearing, that of providing amplification in the cochlea. After his retirement in 2012, he became a professional sculptor.

== Biography ==
An only child, Dallos was born in 1934 in Budapest, Hungary. He attended the Technical University of Budapest from 1953 to 1956, majoring in electrical engineering. After participating in the 1956 anti-Soviet revolution, he escaped and immigrated to the United States. He finished his undergraduate work at the Illinois Institute of Technology (1958), followed by MS (1959) and Ph.D (1962) degrees from Northwestern University. He was one of the first doctoral students to specialize in biomedical engineering (adviser R.W. Jones) under the aegis of the Electrical Engineering department. His thesis work on modeling predictive eye movements is still being cited... Upon completing his degree, he accepted a position with Raymond Carhart in Audiology at Northwestern and became a full professor seven years later. His entire faculty career, which spanned fifty years, was at Northwestern University. In 1977-78 he spent a sabbatical year at the Karolinska Institutet, Stockholm, Sweden, working with Åke Flock. In 1991 he was recruited to be the founding chair of the new Department of Neurobiology and Physiology. Later he served terms as Associate Dean in the College of Arts and Sciences and as Vice President for Research. He was the founding Editor-in-Chief of the journal Auditory Neuroscience (1994–97), served on the Council of Neurology Institute of the NIH (1984–87) and was President of the Association for Research in Otolaryngology (ARO; 1992–93), while also serving on numerous other advisory committees and boards and holding various editorships.

== Research ==
Early work pertained to elucidating the properties and modeling of the acoustic reflex and some excursions into psychophysics. By 1965 he established the Auditory Physiology Laboratory where he and some seventy doctoral students, postdocs and colleagues have produced a body of work that can be characterized in various categories.

[2.1] Contemporary interpretation of the origin and properties of gross electrical responses of the cochlea and auditory nerve. This work forms the basis of present-day measurements and understanding of compound electrical responses of the auditory periphery. The work was summarized in the 1973 monograph: The Auditory Periphery.

[2.2] Discovery of fractional subharmonics in cochlear mechanics, including the first report on chaotic behavior in a biological system, as well as the first demonstration of a form of otoacoustic emissions.

[2.3] First physiological demonstration that cochlear distortion is related to hair cell transduction .

[2.4] First explanation of what determines low-frequency auditory threshold

[2.5] Discovery that inner hair cells respond to basilar membrane velocity

[2.6] Demonstration that in the absence of outer hair cells there is a significant threshold shift, change in frequency selectivity, and linearization of the cochlea. This experimental series forms the basis of much of our current concepts of cochlear function, notably 50-60 dB amplification by outer hair cells

[2.7] First intracellular recordings from outer hair cells in vivo; first intracellular recordings from hair cells in the low-frequency regions of the cochlea

[2.8] First recordings from auditory nerve terminals in vivo

[2.9] Experimental series establishing many properties of electromotility of isolated outer hair cells, including the proof that stereocilia displacement produces outer hair cell motility

[2.10] Invention and development of the hemicochlea technique and intracellular recordings from hair cells in the hemicochlea under basilar membrane stimulation

[2.11] Discovery that outer hair cell axial stiffness is voltage dependent

[2.12] Discovery and elucidation of the properties of the unique outer hair cell motor protein, prestin (SLC26A5), and studies of cochlear amplification in prestin knockin and knockout mice, proof that prestin-driven outer hair cell motility is the mammalian cochlear amplifier

[2.13] Numerous highly cited review articles

[2.14] Books edited

== Selected awards ==
- John Simon Guggenheim Fellowship 1977-1978
- National Institute of Neurological and Communicative Disorders and Stroke, Senator Jacob Javits Neuroscience Investigator Award, 1984-1989
- Amplifon Research and Study Center, International Prize, 1984
- Award of Merit, Association for Research in Otolaryngology, 1994
- Honors of the Association, American Speech, Language, and Hearing Association, 1994
- von Békésy Medal of the Acoustical Society of America, 1995
- Sigma Xi Distinguished National Lecturer, 1997-1998
- Acta Otolaryngologica International Prize, 1997
- Fellow of the American Academy of Arts and Sciences, elected in 1997
- Senior Investigator Award, The McKnight Endowment Fund for Neuroscience, 1997-2000
- Honorary Member, Hungarian Academy of Sciences, elected in 2004.
- Guyot Prize, University of Groningen, The Netherlands, 2004.
- Hugh Knowles Prize, 2005.
- Life Achievement Award, American Auditory Society, 2008.

== Sculpting ==
He has been making welded steel sculptures since 1998 and has been a professional sculptor since his retirement from his professorship in 2012. Has had solo shows in Chicago and New York commercial galleries and participated in numerous juried group shows. Had a solo show at the Weisman Museum of Art, Minneapolis and had his work in small-group shows at the Ukrainian Museum of Art, Chicago and the Hamilton Gallery of Montreat College, NC. His War Series of nine sculptures are in the permanent collection of the US Memorial Holocaust Museum, Washington, DC.
