= Peter Strick =

American neurobiologist (born 1946)

Peter L. Strick (born 1946) is an American neurobiologist currently the Distinguished Professor, Thomas Detre Endowed Chair in Neuroscience & Chair of Neurobiology at University of Pittsburgh, formerly holding the Endowed Chair in Systems Neuroscience there, and also formerly George W. Perkins III Memorial Professor at State University of New York. He is an Elected Fellow of the American Association for the Advancement of Science, American Academy of Arts and Sciences, National Academy of Sciences (2012).
