= William A. V. Clark =

New Zealand - US geographer

William A.V. Clark
- Born: March 21, 1938 (age 88); Christchurch, New Zealand
- Education: University of Canterbury; University of New Zealand; University of Illinois

William Arthur Valentine Clark (born 21 March, 1938, in Christchurch, New Zealand) is Distinguished University Research Professor in the Geography Department at the University of California, Los Angeles. His research focuses on housing markets and residential mobility and migration, and the impacts of local residential change on neighborhood outcomes, including segregation and ethnic and racial patterns.

After joining UCLA in the 1970s, Clark taught and conducted research there for the next four decades. In 2018, he was awarded the Edward A. Dickson Award from the UCLA Emeriti Association and the Lifetime Achievement Honors of the Association of American Geographers. He is an Elected Fellow of the American Academy of Arts and Sciences, an Elected Honorary Fellow of the Royal Society of New Zealand and a member of the National Academy of Sciences.

== Education and career ==
Clark completed his bachelor’s and master’s degrees at the University of Canterbury, then a constituent college of the University of New Zealand. His master's thesis, titled "Dunedin in 1901" : a study in historical urban geography, was completed in 1961. He was awarded a Fulbright Fellowship to attend the University of Illinois, Urbana and received his PhD in geography in 1964. He returned to teach at the University of Canterbury, New Zealand for two years between 1964 and 1966.

Clark then returned to the US to take up an assistant professorship at the University of Wisconsin-Madison. He received tenure in Geography and Planning but resigned in 1970 to move to the Geography Department at UCLA, where he taught and conducted research for four decades. In 2010, he became a Distinguished Research Professor (Emeritus) at UCLA.

He has been the editor of Geographical Analysis (1984–1987), Environment and Planning A (1988–1998) and consulting editor of Tijdschrift voor economische en sociale geografie, (1985–1988). He is a member of the editorial boards of Geographical Analysis and Population, Space and Place.

=== Contributions ===
Clark's research papers have formally tested the Schelling model of choice and showed that the theoretical tolerance distributions outlined by Schelling, could be generated from survey data. A second set of research papers showed how the life cycle generated residential moves and neighborhood outcomes.

Throughout his career, Clark participated in many desegregation court cases studying the racial and ethnic separation patterns around the United States. These studies were stimulated by a question posed by Lewis F. Powell Jr. in the Detroit desegregation litigation (Milliken v Bradley, 1974) – "how can we understand the patterns of ethnic and racial segregation in US cities." The court hearings gave an opportunity to bring geographic and demographic findings about segregation and separation into the court room. Demographic research on the issues of residential segregation and selection was presented in these presentations: Armor v Nix (1979), Dowell (Oklahoma), Freeman v. Pitts (Georgia), Riddick (Norfolk Virginia), Jenkins (Kansas City), and Capacchione vs Charlotte-Mecklenburg (North Carolina). As the court reported in their review of Freeman v Pitts, “when residential segregation occurs as a result of private choices it is beyond the authority and also the ability of federal courts to address these private decisions and the impact of continuing and ongoing demographic changes.”

== Awards and honors ==
Clark was awarded a Fulbright fellowship in 1961 to study in the United States and later received the Honors Award of the Association of American Geographers in 1987. He held the Belle Van Zuylen Professorship, University of Utrecht, The Netherlands in 1989 and was awarded the Doctorate Honoris Causis (Honorary Doctorate), University of Utrecht, The Netherlands in 1992, and a DSc (Doctor of Science) from the University of Auckland, New Zealand in 1994.

Clark was awarded a Guggenheim Fellowship in 1994 and elected an Honorary Fellow of the Royal Society of New Zealand in 1997. In 2003 he was elected as a Fellow of the American Academy of Arts and Sciences and in 2005 to the National Academy of Sciences and in the same year received the Decade of Behavior Research Award. The College of Letters Arts and Sciences of The University of Illinois awarded him the Alumni Achievement Award in 2006.

Clark's recent honors include the 2013 Lifetime Achievement Award of the Population Specialty Group from the Association of American Geographers, a 2014 Benjamin Meaker Research Fellowship from Bristol University, the 2015 Distinguished New Zealand Geographer Medal by New Zealand Geographic Society and the 2018 Lifetime Achievement Honors of the Association of American Geographers. He received the 2018 Edward A. Dickson Award from the UCLA Emeriti Association.

== Selected publications ==
=== Books ===
- Modelling Housing Market Search (1982)
- Households and Housing: Choice and Outcomes in the Housing market (1996)
- The California Cauldron: Immigration and the Fortunes of Local Communities (1998)
- Immigrants and the American Dream: Remaking the Middle Class (2003)
- The Sage Handbook of Housing (2012)

=== Articles ===
- Residential preferences and neighborhood racial segregation: a test of the Schelling segregation model. Demography 28, 1-19. (1991)
- Residential Preferences and Residential Choices in a Multi Ethnic Context. Demography 30, 451-466. (1992)
- Life cycle and housing adjustment as explanations of residential mobility, Urban Studies 20, 47-57. (1983)
- Family migration and mobility sequences in the United States: spatial mobility in the context of the life course. Demographic Research (Max Planck Institute for Demographic Research) 17, Number 20, 591-622. (2007)
- Understanding the social context of the Schelling segregation model. Proceedings of the National Academy of Sciences, 105,4109-4114. (2008)
- Changing Residential Preferences across Income, Education, and Age: Findings from the Multi-City Study of Urban Inequality. Urban Affairs Review 44: 334-355. (2009)
- Do women delay family formation in expensive housing markets? Demographic Research 27, 1-27. (2012)
- Life course events and residential change: unpacking age effects on the probability of moving Journal of Population Research 30, 319-334. (2013)
- A Multi-scalar Analysis of Neighborhood Composition in Los Angeles 2000-2010: A Location-Based Approach to Segregation and Diversity. Annals, Association of American Geographers 105(6) 1260-1284 (2015)
