= Delon Hampton =

American civil engineer (1933–2021)

- Born: August 23, 1933; Jefferson, Texas, U.S.
- Died: January 14, 2021 (aged 87); Potomac, Maryland, U.S.
- Occupations: Civil engineer, educator, business leader
- Employer: Howard University
- Known for: First Black president of the American Society of Civil Engineers
- Awards: National Academy of Engineering (1992)

Academic background
- Education: University of Illinois at Urbana-Champaign (BS), Purdue University (MS, Ph.D.)

Academic work
- Notable works: A Life Constructed: Reflections on Breaking Barriers and Building Opportunities

Delon Hampton (August 23, 1933 – January 14, 2021) was an American civil engineer, educator, and business leader. He was the founder and chairman of Delon Hampton & Associates, a civil and structural engineering firm, and served as the first black president of the American Society of Civil Engineers (ASCE) from 1999 to 2000. Hampton taught civil engineering at Howard university for 25 years, contributing to research and education.

== Early life ==
Hampton was born on August 23, 1933, in Jefferson, Texas, to Charles and Alzadie Douglas. His mother died not too long after his birth. Hampton was adopted and raised by his aunt, Elizabeth Hampton. He attended Englewood High School in Chicago, a commitment that required him to travel more than two hours each way from his home. Despite the distance and challenges, he excelled academically and graduated at just 16 years old. After high school, he explored career fairs at the Illinois Institute of Technology.

== Education ==
Hampton began his academic journey after graduating from Englewood High School at the age of 16. He first attended the University of Illinois at Urbana-Champaign, where he earned a Bachelor of Science in Civil Engineering in 1954, developing a strong interest in bridge design. He briefly continued his education at Howard University before transferring to Purdue University, where he earned both his Master of Science in Civil Engineering in 1958 and Ph.D. in Civil Engineering in 1961.

== Career ==
Hampton finished his civil engineering degree at the University of Illinois at Urbana-Champaign in 1954. He then served in the U.S. Army for two years. After leaving the military, he went to Purdue University, earning a master’s degree in 1958 and a Ph.D. in 1961. He started teaching at Kansas State University from 1961 to 64 and briefly led the soil mechanics research program at the University of New Mexico that time. From 1964 to 1968, he worked at the Illinois Institute of Technology in Chicago, before joining Howard University, where he taught and did research for 25 years. In 1973, he started his own firm, Delon Hampton & Associates. Hampton became the first African American president of the American Society of Civil Engineers from 1999 to 2000. Purdue University renamed its civil engineering building in his honor in 2012. In 2013, he published a memoir, A Life Constructed: Reflections on Breaking Barriers and Building Opportunities, about his career and efforts to support diversity in engineering.

== Awards and achievements ==
Hampton was elected to the National Academy of Engineering in 1992. Hampton has a history of serving as President in the American Society of Civil Engineers (ASCE) in 2000. In 2012 Hampton was honored through the renaming of an engineering building at Purdue University to the Delon and Elizabeth Hampton Hall of Civil Engineering. Being an educational influence, he accomplished achievements like receiving the Edmund Friedman Professional Recognition Award and the James Laurie Prize. Through leadership roles held by the American Public Transportation Association he's held others including Chair, Vice Chair, Executive and Committee Member. Hampton was elected a member of the American Academy of Arts and Sciences in 2002.

== Death and legacy ==
Hampton died on January 14, 2021 at his home in Potomac, Maryland, his cause of death was due to Alzheimer's disease.
