= E. Peter Geiduschek =

Austrian-born American molecular biologist (1928–2022)

- Born: April 11, 1928; Vienna, Austria
- Died: April 8, 2022 (aged 93); California, United States
- Education: Columbia University; Harvard University
- Known for: DNA denaturation studies Transcriptional regulation Bacteriophage T4 gene expression RNA polymerase III transcription (TFIIIB)
- Awards: National Academy of Sciences (1974); American Academy of Arts and Sciences (1975); Order of Merit of the Italian Republic; Gregor Johann Mendel Medal (Czech Academy of Sciences)
- Scientific career
- Fields: Molecular biology
- Workplaces: University of California, San Diego; University of Chicago; Yale University; Stanford University
- Doctoral advisor: Paul M. Doty

Ernest Peter Geiduschek (April 11, 1928 – April 8, 2022) was an Austrian-born American molecular biologist whose research addressed the physical properties of DNA and the mechanisms of transcription and gene regulation. His work included early measurements of DNA denaturation and studies of RNA synthesis that established fundamental features of transcription, including strand-specific copying of DNA templates.

Using bacteriophage systems, particularly T4, he investigated the regulation of gene expression and identified factors controlling promoter recognition and transcriptional timing during viral infection. He later contributed to the analysis of eukaryotic transcription, including the identification and characterization of RNA polymerase III transcription factors such as TFIIIB. He was a professor at the University of California, San Diego and was elected to the National Academy of Sciences in 1974.

== Early life and education ==
Geiduschek was born in Vienna, Austria, into a Jewish family. Following the annexation of Austria by Nazi Germany in 1938, his family was affected by persecution, and he later continued his education in England. He attended Columbia University and later completed graduate studies at Harvard University, where he worked in the laboratory of Paul M. Doty.

== Career and research ==
After positions at Yale University, the University of Michigan, and the University of Chicago, Geiduschek joined the faculty at the University of California, San Diego in 1970. He remained there for more than four decades and contributed to the development of molecular biology at the institution.

His early work focused on the physical properties of DNA, including measurements of DNA denaturation and the role of solvent conditions in helix stability. He demonstrated that DNA strand separation is reversible and that forces beyond hydrogen bonding contribute to helix stability.

Geiduschek then turned to transcription. In early biochemical studies, his lab demonstrated that RNA synthesized in vitro is complementary to its DNA template and that transcription proceeds without complete unwinding of the DNA helix. He also showed that transcription of bacteriophage DNA is asymmetric, indicating that only one DNA strand serves as the template.

Using bacteriophage systems, particularly T4, his laboratory investigated the regulation of gene expression during viral infection. His work showed that the bacteriophage T4 gene 55 protein functions as a sigma-like factor that directs promoter recognition by RNA polymerase. These studies also established that late transcription in T4 is coupled to DNA replication and depends on phage-encoded regulatory factors. His laboratory further demonstrated that transcriptional activation in this system can require proteins that track along DNA to mediate enhancer function.

In later work, Geiduschek studied transcription by RNA polymerase III in the yeast Saccharomyces cerevisiae. His laboratory purified transcription factors required for RNA polymerase III activity and showed that TFIIIB is the core initiation factor for transcription, while other factors function in complex assembly. He also applied biochemical and photo-crosslinking approaches to analyze protein–DNA interactions in transcription complexes.

In the 2000s, he contributed to studies of archaeal transcription, helping to define similarities between transcription systems in bacteria and eukaryotes.

== Honors and awards ==
Geiduschek was elected to the National Academy of Sciences in 1974 and to the American Academy of Arts and Sciences in 1975. He also received international honors including the Order of Merit of the Italian Republic (1996) and the Gregor Johann Mendel Medal from the Czech Academy of Sciences in 2004.

== Later life ==
He remained active in research after retirement and served as a consulting professor at Stanford University. He died on April 8, 2022.
