= Jonathan Seidman =

American geneticist

- Education: Harvard University; University of Wisconsin
- Spouse: Christine Seidman
- Children: 3
- Scientific career
- Workplaces: Harvard Medical School; National Institute of Health

Jonathan G. Seidman is the Henrietta B. and Frederick H. Bugher Foundation Professor of Genetics at Harvard Medical School. He operates a joint lab with his wife, Christine Seidman, where they study genetic mechanisms of heart disease.

== Career ==
Jonathan Seidman grew up in Norwalk, Connecticut and went to high school in Ghana. He studied biochemistry at Harvard University, graduating in 1971. In 1975, he completed his PhD in molecular biology at the University of Wisconsin.

After doing postdoctoral research at the National Institute of Health in the lab of Philip Leder, he began working at Harvard Medical School in 1981. He is now the Henrietta B. and Frederick H. Bugher Foundation Professor of Genetics. He was a Howard Hughes Medical Institute investigator from 1988-2005.

The Seidman lab researches the genetics involved in diseases such as hypertrophic cardiomyopathy, and was recognized for discovering the first genetic cause of congenital heart defects.

Beginning in 2009, the Harvard-MIT Program in Health Sciences and Technology has awarded the Seidman Prize for MD Research Mentorship in honor of him and his wife.

== Personal life ==
Seidman's parents were Ann Seidman and Robert B. Seidman, respectively an economist and law and development scholar. The Seidmans were among several who established one of the first interracial planned communities on the East Coast of the US, at Village Creek in Norwalk, Connecticut in the 1950s. Jonathan Seidman and some of his four siblings were born there. The settlement exists to this day. The family then moved around Africa, teaching at the University of Ghana and other institutions.

Seidman met his wife, Christine Seidman, while they were students at Harvard, and they were married in 1973. They operate a joint lab at Harvard and are both founding members of MyoKardia. In 2002, they shared the Bristol-Myers Squibb Award for Distinguished Achievement in Cardiovascular Research. They have three children.

== Awards ==
- 2002 Bristol-Myers Squibb Award
- 2007 Elected to the National Academy of Sciences
- 2007 Elected to the National Academy of Medicine
- 2008 Katz Prize in Cardiovascular Research, Columbia University
