= Village Creek (Norwalk, Connecticut) =

- U.S. National Register of Historic Places
- U.S. Historic district
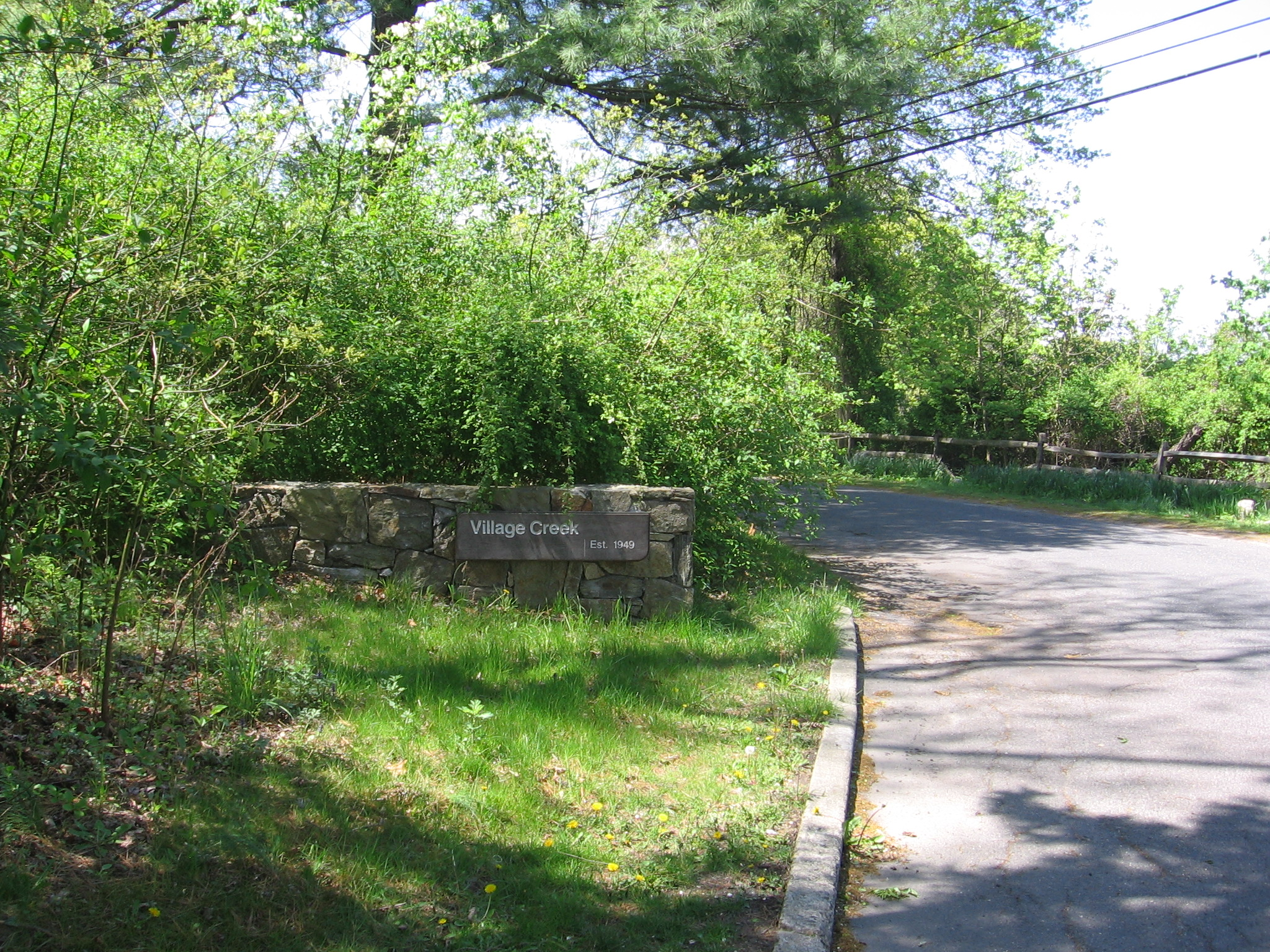
- Entrance to Village Creek, April 28, 2012

- Location within Connecticut
- Location: Roughly bounded by Village Creek, Hayes Creek and Woodward Avenue, Norwalk, Connecticut
- Coordinates: 41°4′44″N 73°25′6″W
- NRHP reference No.: 10000493
- Added to NRHP: July 26, 2010

Village Creek is a coastal community in the South Norwalk Neighborhood of the City of Norwalk, Connecticut which was listed on the U.S. National Register of Historic Places in 2010. It is also the name of a creek upon which the community is built. Managed and maintained by the VCHOA, residents are entitled to access a private beach, marina and tennis courts.

Established in 1949, the neighborhood is historically distinctive for its efforts to maintain a balanced racial composition, a practice enforced by the home owners association, at a time when deed covenants restricting ownership by race and ethnicity were common. The neighborhood was listed on the National Register of Historic Places in 2010.

== See also ==
- National Register of Historic Places listings in Fairfield County, Connecticut
