= Miaofang Chi =

Chinese-American researcher

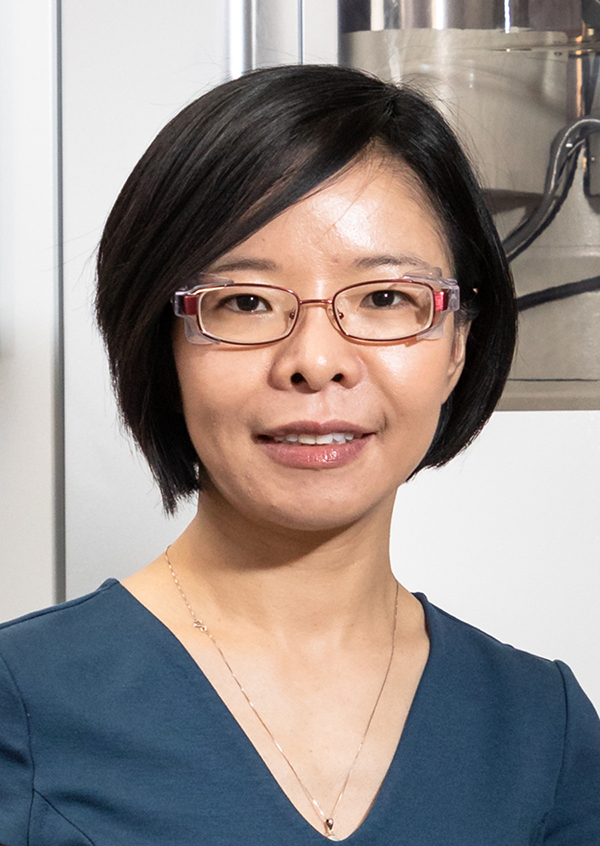
- Miaofang Chi at Oak Ridge National Laboratory in 2019
- Education: University of California, Davis; Chinese Academy of Sciences
- Scientific career
- Workplaces: Oak Ridge National Laboratory; Lawrence Livermore National Laboratory; National Center for Electron Microscopy

Miaofang Chi is a Corporate Fellow at the Center for Nanophase Materials Sciences in Oak Ridge National Laboratory. Her primary research interests are understanding interfacial charge transfer and mass transport behavior in energy and quantum materials and systems by advancing and employing novel electron microscopy techniques, such as in situ and cryogenic scanning transmission electron microscopy. She was awarded the 2016 Microscopy Society of America Burton Medal and the 2019 Microanalysis Society Kurt Heinrich Award. She was named to Clarivate's list of Highly Cited Researchers in 2018 and 2020.

== Early life ==
Chi was born in Zhejiang, China. She first interacted with a microscope whilst in primary school, and became fascinated by the idea of using science to understand a world visible to the naked eye. She received her master's degree at the Shanghai Institute of Ceramics (Chinese Academy of Sciences), where she earned a degree in materials science and engineering. Chi completed her doctoral research in materials science at the University of California, Davis. She worked in the National Center for Electron Microscopy at the Lawrence Berkeley National Laboratory. She was appointed a Research Fellow at the Lawrence Livermore National Laboratory in 2006. Her research was supported by the Lawrence Graduate Research Fellowship. During her graduate studies, she started to work on aberration-corrected electron microscopy and monochromated electron energy loss spectroscopy to investigate perovskites for ferroics. Whilst at the Lawrence Berkeley National Laboratory, Chi also used electron microscopy to study materials collected from the comet 8P/Tuttle. She was one of the first to make use of aberration corrected STEM and monochromated EELS for planetary science.

== Research and career ==
In 2008, Chi joined the Oak Ridge National Laboratory (ORNL), where she develops and applies microscopy techniques in to materials for energy and sustainability. She has explored differential phase contrast imaging, aberration-corrected electron microscopy and in situ microscopic techniques. Her early research at ORNL focused on the design of novel catalysts at the atomic scale for PEM full cells. Later her research was centered on understanding ion transport behavior in solid electrolytes and their interfaces with electrolytes for all solid-state batteries. She is particularly interested in understanding atomic packing at interfaces and surfaces at the atomic scale, and how these influence the formance of energy devices, for example capability, cyclability, and rate capability of batteries. Chi is looking to expand the capability of electron microscopy beyond atomic nuclei, and ultimately be able to image electrons in electride materials.

Chi serves on the editorial board of Materials Today.

== Awards and honors ==
- ORNL Director's Award for Outstanding Individual Accomplishment in Science and Technology
- Early Career Research Award
- Microscopy Society of America Burton Medal
- Presidential Early Career Award for Scientists and Engineers
- Microanalysis Society Kurt Heinrich Award

== Selected publications ==
- Chen Chen; Yijin Kang; Ziyang Huo; et al. (2014). "Highly crystalline multimetallic nanoframes with three-dimensional electrocatalytic surfaces". Science. 343 (6177): 1339–1343. doi:10.1126/science.1249061. PMID 24578531. Wikidata Q45996619.
- Xun Shi; Jiong Yang; James R. Salvador; et al. (2011). "Multiple-Filled Skutterudites: High Thermoelectric Figure of Merit through Separately Optimizing Electrical and Thermal Transports". Journal of the American Chemical Society. 133 (20): 7837–7846. doi:10.1021/ja111199y. PMID 21524125. Wikidata Q57965951.
- Brownlee, Donald Don; Zou, Peter; Jérôme Aléon; et al. (2006). "Comet 81P/Wild 2 under a microscope". Science. 314 (5806): 1711–1716. Bibcode:2006Sci...314.1711B. doi:10.1126/science.1135840. PMID 17170289. Wikidata Q33266658.
