= Honda Prize =

- Country: Japan
- Reward: 10 million yen
- First award: 1980; 46 years ago

The Honda Prize is awarded by the Honda Foundation. It is awarded for "the efforts of an individual or group who contribute new ideas which may lead the next generation in the field of ecotechnology". It is sometimes referred to as the "Nobel Prize in Technology" since it has put a spotlight on achievements in a variety of fields based on a wide perspective in the future, including two Turing-awarded artificial intelligence accomplishments.

== Prize ==
The prize consists of a diploma, medal, and a reward of 10 million yen.

== List of recipients ==
| Year | Name | Nationality |
|---|---|---|
| 1980 | Gunnar Hambraeus | Sweden |
| 1981 | Harold Chestnut | USA |
| 1982 | John F. Coales | UK |
| 1983 | Ilya Prigogine | Belgium |
| 1984 | Umberto Colombo | Italy |
| 1985 | Carl Sagan | USA |
| 1986 | Jun-ichi Nishizawa | Japan |
| 1987 | Jean Dausset | France |
| 1988 | Paolo Maria Fasella | Italy |
| 1989 | Lotfi A. Zadeh | USA |
| 1990 | Frei Otto | Germany |
| 1991 | M. S. Swaminathan | India |
| 1992 | Hermann Haken | Germany |
| 1993 | Koki Horikoshi | Japan |
| 1994 | Benoit Mandelbrot | France-USA |
| 1995 | Åke E. Andersson | Sweden |
| 1996 | Bruce Ames | USA |
| 1997 | Günter Petzow | Germany |
| 1998 | Hubert Curien | France |
| 1999 | Aleksandra Kornhauser | Slovenia |
| 2000 | Shuji Nakamura | Japan |
| 2001 | Donald Mackay | Canada |
| 2002 | Barry John Cooper | UK |
| 2003 | Ken-ichi Mori | Japan |
| 2004 | Walter C. Willett | USA |
| 2005 | Raj Reddy | USA |
| 2006 | Richard R. Nelson | USA |
| 2007 | Philippe Mouret | France |
| 2008 | Harald Rose | Germany |
| 2008 | Knut Urban | Germany |
| 2008 | Maximilian Haider | Austria |
| 2009 | Ian Frazer | Australia |
| 2010 | António Damásio | USA/Portugal |
| 2011 | Gábor A. Somorjai | USA |
| 2012 | Denis Le Bihan | France |
| 2013 | J. Tinsley Oden | USA |
| 2014 | Helmut Clemens | Austria |
| 2015 | Russell H. Taylor | USA |
| 2016 | Akira Isogai | Japan |
| 2016 | Hiroyuki Yano | Japan |
| 2017 | Hiroyuki Matsunami | Japan |
| 2018 | Fujio Masuoka | Japan |
| 2019 | Geoffrey E. Hinton | UK/Canada |
| 2020 | Henning Kagermann | Germany |
| 2021 | Alim Louis Benabid | France |
| 2022 | Hidetoshi Katori | Japan |
| 2023 | Masato Sagawa; John J. Croat | Japan; USA |
| 2024 | James Fujimoto | USA |
