= K. Andre Mkhoyan =

American-Armenian Materials Scientist

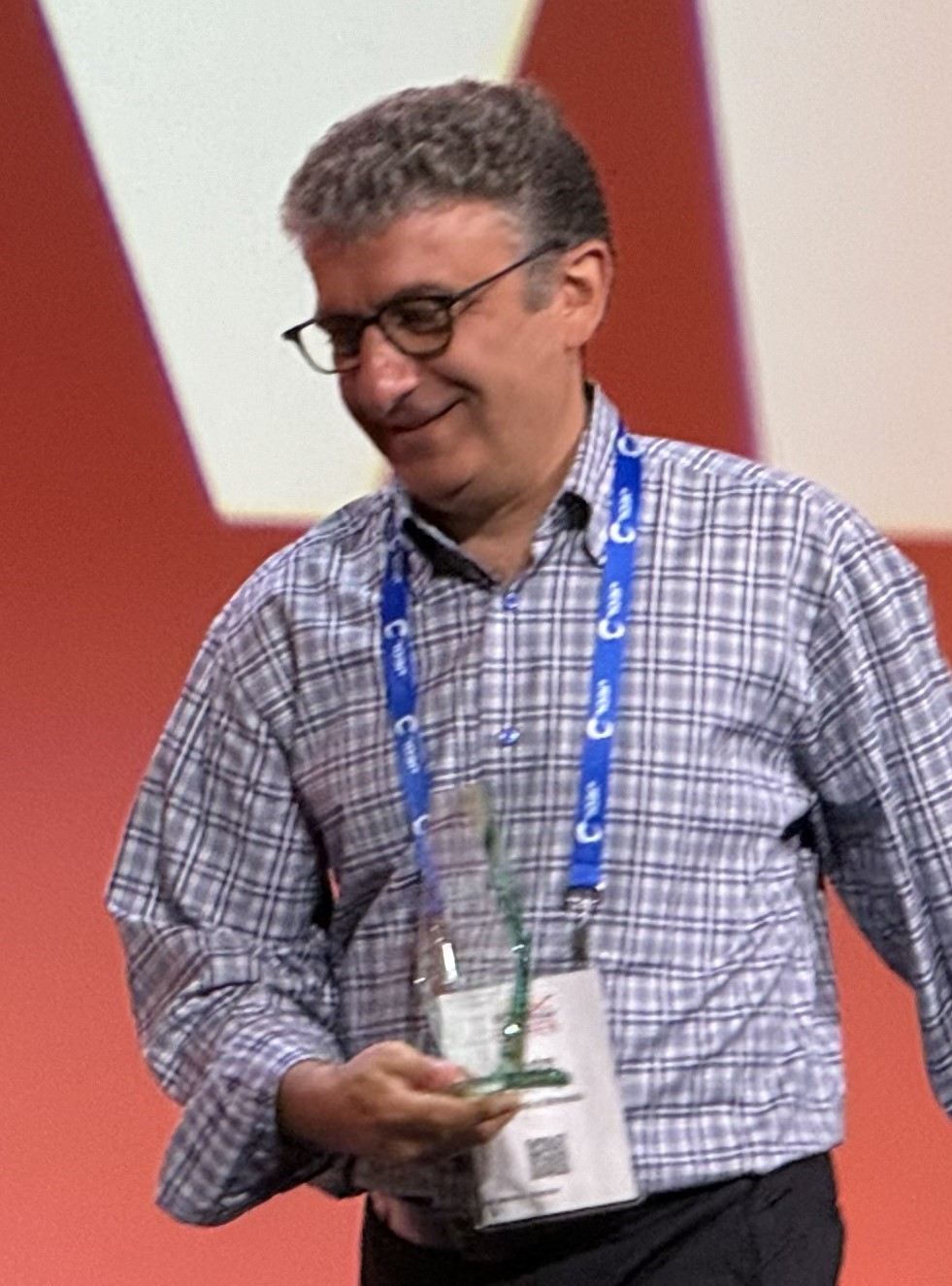
- Born: 1974 (age 51–52); Yerevan, Armenia
- Education: Yerevan State University, Armenia (1996); Cornell University (M.S. 2003, Ph.D. 2004)
- Title: K. Andre Mkhoyan
- Awards: Fellow, Microscopy Society of America

K. Andre Mkhoyan (born 1974) is the Ray D. and Mary T. Johnson Chair and Professor in the Department of Chemical Engineering and Materials Science at the University of Minnesota. He is recognized for advancing both fundamental scientific understanding and diverse applications of scanning transmission electron microscopy (STEM) techniques. He was elected as a Microscopy Society of America Fellow in 2024 for "seminal contributions to the understanding of electron beam channeling, quantification of imaging and spectroscopy in STEM, and for his discovery of fundamentally new behavior in crystal point and line defects using STEM." According to Web of Science, he has produced over 180 published works that have been cited over 9800 times, with an h-index of 44 as of October 25, 2024.

== Early life and education ==
Andre Mkhoyan was born in 1974 in Yerevan, Armenia. He received his high school diploma from the prestigious Artashes Shahinyan Physics-Mathematics School. In 1996, Mkhoyan graduated with a B.Sc. (Hons.) in Physics from the Yerevan State University. Following graduation, he moved to the United States to pursue a research career specialized in transmission electron microscopy (TEM). After working at Bell Labs as a research scientist in support of the SCALPEL projection electron-beam lithography project, he began graduate studies in Applied and Engineering Physics at Cornell University in 1999. Working under the supervision of Professor John Silcox (1935–2024), Mkhoyan received his M.S. in Engineering Physics in 2003 and Ph.D. in Applied Physics in 2004. His dissertation was titled "Scanning Transmission Electron Microscopy Study of III-V Nitrides."

In his postdoctoral research studies, Mkhoyan worked with Professor Silcox at Cornell as well as with Dr. Philip E. Batson at the IBM TJ Watson Lab. In this period, he was one of the first people to work on a prototype aberration-corrected STEM on a VG microscope retro-fitted with a NION probe-corrector. He worked extensively on understanding electron beam channeling, spectroscopy and quantification methods during this time. In 2008, Mkhoyan joined the University of Minnesota as an Assistant Professor of Chemical Engineering and Materials Science where he continues to be a professor and lead an electron microscopy research group. He is also the chair for the Electron Microscopy Management Committee at the University of Minnesota.

== Scientific contributions ==
Mkhoyan has contributed to fundamental studies of electron microscopy physics as well as pioneered challenging applications of high resolution analytical STEM, specifically, multimodal use of EELS and EDX signals in conjunction with annular dark-field imaging to materials science. He has been credited for pushing the boundaries of atomic-resolution analytical STEM for the better understanding of point, line and planar defects, including discoveries of two new line defects and interaction mechanisms between dopant atoms and dislocations. He has worked extensively on development of new methods of STEM-based atomic-resolution imaging and EELS spectroscopy of highly-beam-sensitive zeolites and metal organic frameworks. and atomic-resolution in-situ STEM work. His research has improved understanding of electron beam channeling and quantification of imaging and EELS spectroscopy in STEM, which includes identification of the factors behind electron beam channeling even in non-periodic crystals and discovery of new kind of sub-atomic beam channeling.

== Works ==
Andre Mkhoyan has authored numerous journal articles describing significant advances in STEM, defects in materials, nanoporous materials, complex oxides, and two-dimensional/single-layer materials which includes but is not limited to:

1. Dopant Segregation Inside and Outside Dislocation Cores in Perovskite BaSnO_{3} and Reconstruction of the Local Atomic and Electronic Structures; H. Yun; A. Prakash; T. Birol; B. Jalan, K. A. Mkhoyan; Nano Lett. 21, 10, 4357 (2021)
2. Metallic line defect in wide-bandgap transparent perovskite BaSnO3; H. Yun, M. Topsakal, A. Prakash, B. Jalan, J. S. Jeong, T. Birol, K. A. Mkhoyan; Sci. Adv. 7, eabd4449 (2021)
3. Uncovering atomic migrations behind magnetic tunnel junction breakdown; H. Yun, D. Lyu, Y. Lv, B. R. Zink, P. Khanal, B. Zhou, W. G. Wang, J. P. Wang, K. A. Mkhoyan; ACS Nano 18, 25708 (2024)
4. One-dimensional intergrowths in two-dimensional zeolite nanosheets and their effect on ultra-selective transport; P. Kumar, D. W. Kim, N. Rangnekar, H. Xu, E. O. Fetisov, S. Ghosh, H. Zhang, Q. Xiao, M. Shete, J. I. Siepmann, T. Dumitrica, B. McCool, M. Tsapatsis, K. A. Mkhoyan; Nature Mater. 19, 443 (2020)
5. A New Line Defect in NdTiO3 Perovskite; J. S. Jeong, M. Topsakal, P. Xu, B. Jalan, R. M. Wentzcovitch, K. A. Mkhoyan; Nano Lett. 16, 6816 (2016)
6. Probing core-electron orbitals by scanning transmission electron microscopy and measuring the delocalization of core-level excitations; J. S. Jeong, M. L. Odlyzko, P. Xu, B. Jalan, and K. A. Mkhoyan; Phys. Rev. B 93, 165140 (2016)
7. Imaging 'Invisible' Dopant Atoms in Semiconductor Nanocrystals; A. A. Gunawan, K. A. Mkhoyan, A. W. Wills, M. G. Thomas, D. J. Norris; Nano Lett. 11, 5553 (2011)
8. Radiolysis to knock-on damage transition in zeolites under electron beam irradiation; O. Ugurlu, J. Haus, A. A. Gunawan, M. G. Thomas, S. Maheshwari, M. Tsapatsis, K. A. Mkhoyan; Phys Rev B, 83, 113408 (2011)
9. Atomic and Electronic Structure of Graphene-Oxide; K.A. Mkhoyan, A.W. Contryman, J. Silcox, D.A. Stewart, G. Eda, C. Mattevi, S. Miller, M. Chhowalla; Nano Lett. 9, 1058 (2009)
10. Full recovery of electron damage in glass at ambient temperatures; K.A. Mkhoyan, J. Silcox, A. Ellison, D. Ast, R. Dieckmann, Phys. Rev. Lett. 96, 205506 (2006)
