= Harald Rose =

German physicist

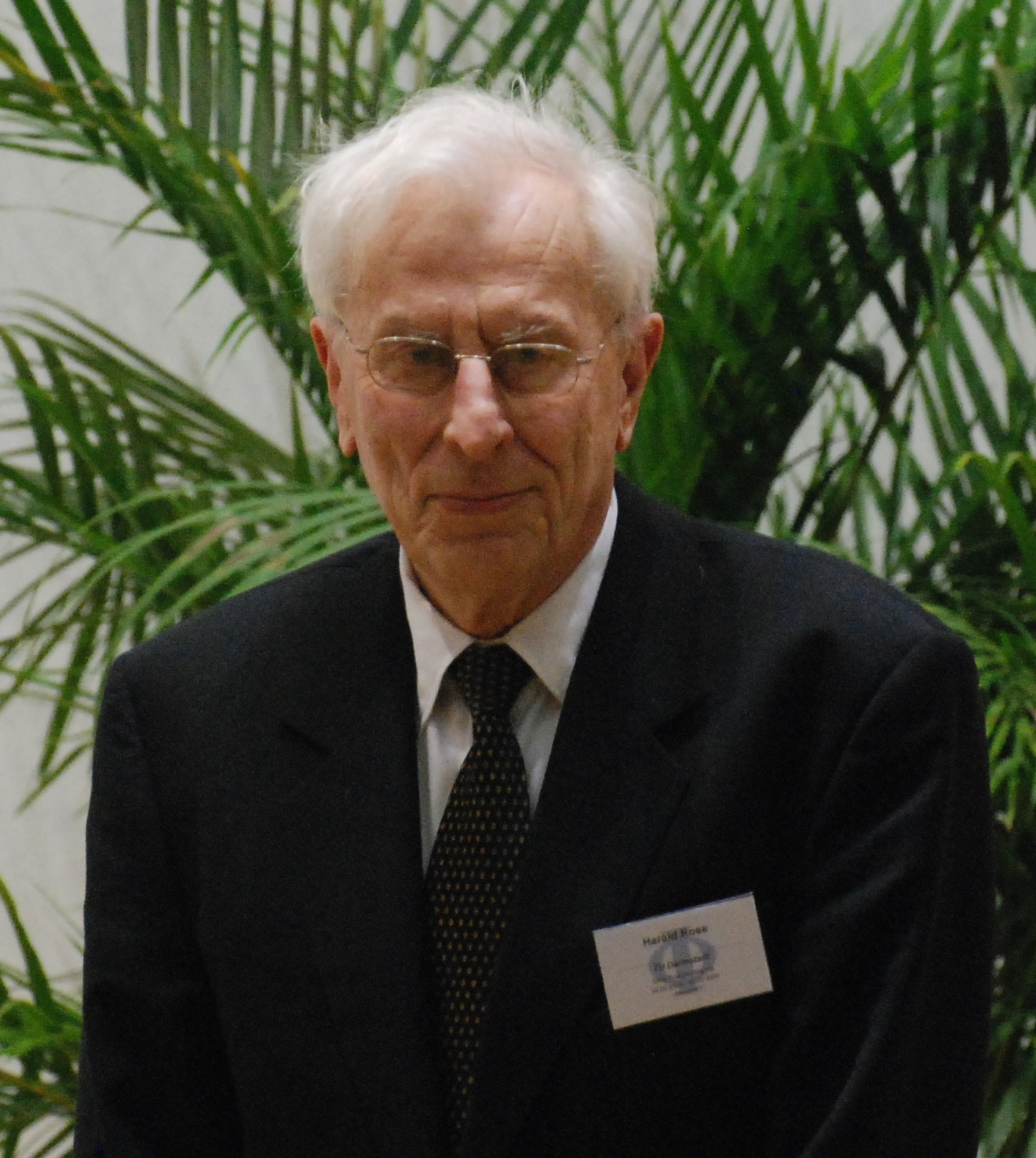
- Born: 14 February 1935 (age 91); Bremen, Germany
- Known for: Aberration-corrected transmission electron microscopy
- Awards: Wolf Prize in Physics (2011); BBVA Foundation Frontiers of Knowledge Award (2013); Kavli Prize in Nanoscience (2020)
- Scientific career
- Fields: Electron microscopy

Harald Rose (born 14 February 1935; died 27 July 2026) was a German physicist. He was a laureate of the 2011 Wolf Prize in Physics and the 2020 Kavli Prize in Nanoscience for the development of aberration-corrected transmission electron microscopy.

== Biography ==
Rose was born in Bremen.

Rose received in 1964 his physics Diplom in theoretical electron optics under Otto Scherzer at the Technische Universität Darmstadt. From 1976 to 1980 he was principal research scientist at New York State Department of Health. In 1973–1974 he spent one research year at the Enrico Fermi Institute of the University of Chicago and in 1995–1996 one research year at Cornell University and the University of Maryland. From 1980 to his retirement in 2000 as professor emeritus, he was active at the University of Darmstadt in the Physics Department. Since 2009 he has held a Carl Zeiss funded Senior Professorship at the University of Ulm. Rose has 105 patents of scientific instruments and electrooptical components. He died on July 26, 2026.

== Awards and honors ==
- 1987 Honorary Professor of the Xi'an Jiaotong University, China
- 2003 Distinguished Scientist Award of the Microscopy Society of America
- 2006 Karl Heinz Beckurts Prize (together with Maximilian Haider and Knut Urban)
- 2008 Honda Prize (together with Maximilian Haider and Knut Urban)
- 2008 Honorary Fellow of the Royal Society of Microscopy (Hon FRMS)
- 2009 Robert Wichard Pohl Prize
- 2011 Wolf Prize for Physics (together with Maximilian Haider and Knut Urban)
- 2013 BBVA Foundation Frontiers of Knowledge Award in Basic Sciences (together with Maximilian Haider and Knut Urban)
- 2020 Kavli Prize in Nanoscience (together with Maximilian Haider and Knut Urban and Ondrej Krivanek).

== Publications ==
- Rose, Harald (2009). Geometrical charged-particle optics. Berlin: Springer. ISBN 978-3-540-85915-4. OCLC 314175917.
