= Knut Urban =

German physicist

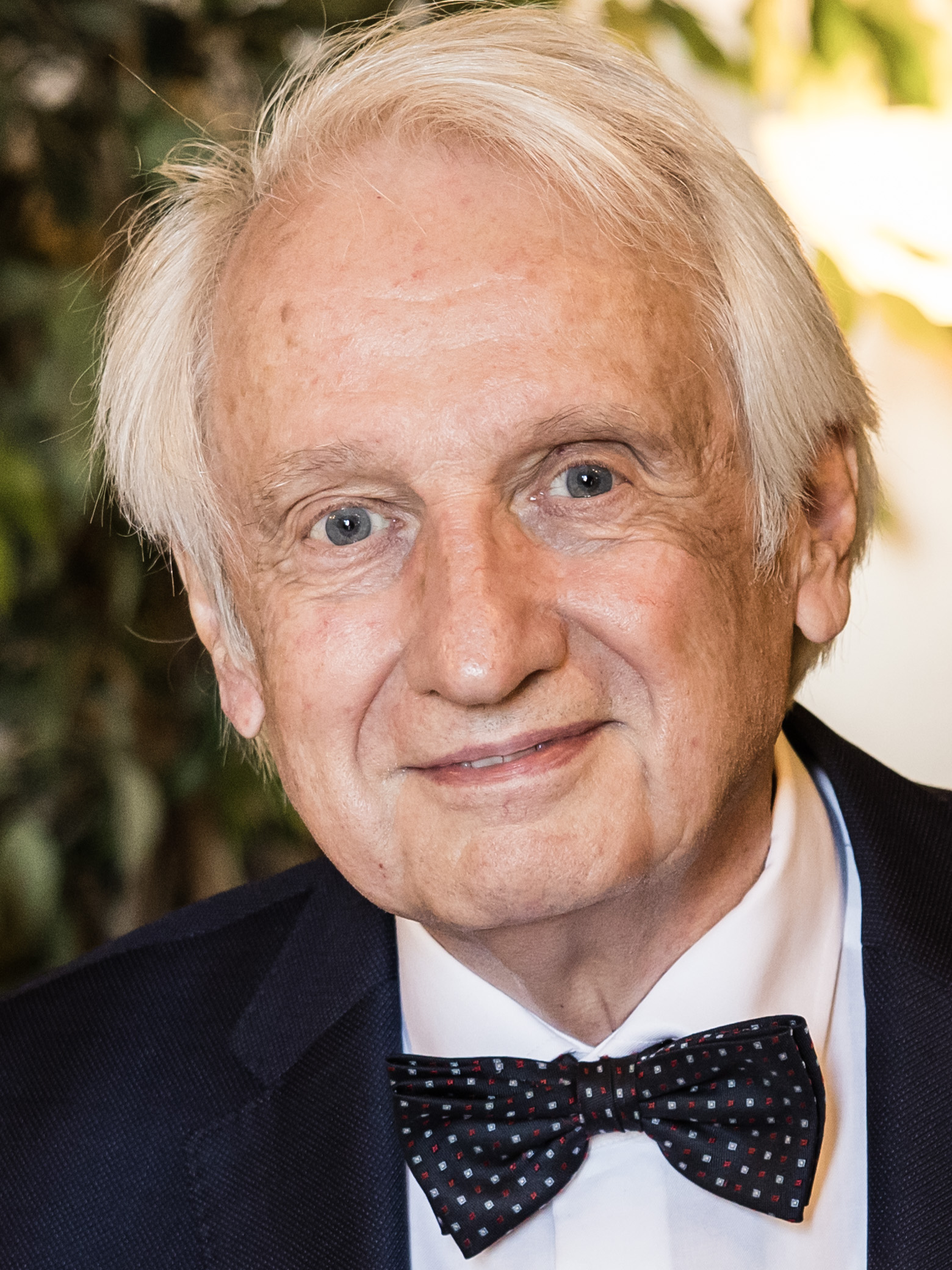
- Knut Urban (2022)
- Born: 25 June 1941 (age 85); Stuttgart, Germany
- Education: University of Stuttgart (PhD)
- Known for: Aberration-corrected transmission electron microscopy
- Awards: Wolf Prize in Physics (2011); BBVA Foundation Frontiers of Knowledge Award (2013); Kavli Prize (2020)
- Scientific career
- Fields: Electron microscopy
- Workplaces: Forschungszentrum Jülich

Knut W. Urban (born 25 June 1941) is a German physicist. He has been the Director of the Institute of Microstructure Research at Forschungszentrum Jülich from 1987 to 2010.

Knut Urban's research focuses on the field of electron microscopy (both regarding the further development of instruments and the control software), the examination of structural defects in oxides and the physical properties of complex metallic alloys. He also works on Josephson effects in high-temperature superconductors and the application of these effects in SQUID systems and magnetometers as well as on the application of Hilbert transform spectroscopy in examining the excitation of solids, liquids and gases on the gigahertz and terahertz scale.

Besides his activities at Forschungszentrum Jülich he was also professor for experimental physics at RWTH Aachen University before retirement.

He is the laureate of the Wolf Prize in Physics and the 2020 Kavli Prize in Nanonoscience for the development of aberration-corrected transmission electron microscopy with Harald Rose and Maximilian Haider.

== Biography ==
Knut Urban was born in Stuttgart, Germany in 1941.

Urban studied physics at the University of Stuttgart and was awarded a PhD in 1972 for his dissertation on the study of the damage caused by the electron beams in a high-voltage electron microscope at low temperatures. He subsequently conducted research at the Max Planck Institute of Metals Research in Stuttgart until 1986. Amongst other tasks, he was involved in the installation of a 1.2-MV high-voltage microscope laboratory as well as in studies on the anisotropy of atomic displacement energy in crystals and on radiation-induced diffusion. In 1986 he was appointed professor of general material properties by the Department of Materials Science and Engineering at the University of Erlangen-Nuremberg. In 1987 Urban was appointed to the chair of experimental physics at RWTH Aachen University and simultaneously became the director of the Institute of Microstructure Research at Forschungszentrum Jülich. From 1996 to 1997 he was a visiting professor at the Institute for Advanced Materials Processing of Tohoku University in Sendai (Japan). Knut Urban was appointed one of two directors of the Ernst Ruska Centre for Microscopy and Spectroscopy with Electrons (ER-C) when it was founded in 2004 as a common competence platform of Forschungszentrum Jülich and RWTH Aachen University as well as a national centre for users of high-resolution transmission electron microscopes.

From 2004 to 2006 he was president of the German Physical Society (DPG) which is the world's largest organisation of physicists. He is a member of several advisory bodies, boards of trustees and senate committees of scientific institutions.

Knut Urban formally retired as the Director of the Institute of Microstructure Research and the Ernst Ruska Centre (ER-C) in Jülich in 2010 and was appointed a JARA senior professor at RWTH Aachen University in 2012. In 2009, he was elected a member of the North Rhine-Westphalian Academy of Sciences, Humanities and the Arts.

Knut Urban is married and has three daughters.

== Awards and honours ==
- 1986 Acta Metallurgica Award (best paper of the year 1984)
- 1986 Carl Wagner Award, University of Göttingen
- 1996 Research Award of the Japanese Society for the Promotion of Science
- 1999 Heyn Medal of German Society for Materials Science (DGM)
- 2000 Honorary Member Materials Research Society of India
- 2000 Medal for Scientific Publishing of the German Physical Society (DPG)
- 2006 Von Hippel Award of the US Materials Research Society (MRS)
- 2006 Honorary Member of US Materials Research Society (MRS)
- 2006 Karl Heinz Beckurts-Award for Scientific and Technical Innovation
- 2008 Honda Award for Ecotechnology (Honda Foundation, Japan)
- 2009 Appointment Member of the Academy of Arts and Sciences of the State of North Rhine-Westphalia, Germany
- 2009 Honorary Professor at Xi'an Jiaotong University, Xi'an, China
- 2011 Wolf Prize in Physics
- 2012 Honorary Member German Electron Microscopy Society
- 2014 BBVA Foundation Frontiers of Knowledge Award in Basic Sciences (BBVA Foundation, Madrid/Spain)
- 2015 Honorary Member German Physical Society
- 2015 Honorary Member Japanese Institute of Metals and Materials
- 2015 NIMS Award (National Institute of Materials Science, Tsukuba, Japan)
- 2018 Doctor honoris causa, Tel Aviv University
- 2020 He has been awarded the Kavli Prize in neuroscience,(together with Maximilian Haider and Harald Rose and Ondrej Krivanek).
- 2020 Election as Foreign Member of the Norwegian Academy of Science and Letters
