= Wolf Prize in Physics =

One of six awards of the Wolf Foundation

The Wolf Prize in Physics is awarded once a year by the Wolf Foundation in Israel. It is one of the six Wolf Prizes established by the Foundation and awarded since 1978; the others are in Agriculture, Chemistry, Mathematics, Medicine and Arts.

The Wolf Prizes in Physics and Chemistry are often considered the second-most prestigious awards in those fields, after the Nobel Prize. The prize in physics has gained a reputation for identifying future winners of the Nobel Prize – from the 26 prizes awarded between 1978 and 2010, fourteen winners have gone on to win the Nobel Prize, five of those in the following year.

== Laureates ==
Year	Laureate		Country (Note: The country in which the laureate's academic affiliation is based, according to the Wolfe Foundation website.)	Citation	Ref.
Year	Image	Name	Country	Citation	Ref.
1978		Chien-Shiung Wu	United States	"For her persistent and successful exploration of the weak interaction which helped establish the precise form and the non conservation of parity for this new natural force."	
1979		George E. Uhlenbeck	United States	"For his discovery, jointly with the late Samuel A .Goudsmit, of the electron spin."	
1979		Giuseppe Occhialini	Italy	"For his contributions to the discovery of electron pair production and of the charged pion."	
1980	Kenneth G. Wilson		United States	"For path breaking developments culminating in the general theory of the critical behavior at transitions between the different thermodynamic phases of matter."	
1980		Leo P. Kadanoff	United States	"For path breaking developments culminating in the general theory of the critical behavior at transitions between the different thermodynamic phases of matter."	
1980	Michael E. Fisher		United States	"For path breaking developments culminating in the general theory of the critical behavior at transitions between the different thermodynamic phases of matter."	
1981		Freeman J. Dyson	United States	"For their outstanding contributions to theoretical physics, especially in the development and application of the quantum theory of fields."	
1981		Gerard 't Hooft	Netherlands	"For their outstanding contributions to theoretical physics, especially in the development and application of the quantum theory of fields."	
1981		Victor F. Weisskopf	United States	"For their outstanding contributions to theoretical physics, especially in the development and application of the quantum theory of fields."	
1982		Leon M. Lederman	United States	"For their experimental discovery of unexpected new particles establishing a third generation quarks and leptons."	
1982		Martin L. Perl	United States	"For their experimental discovery of unexpected new particles establishing a third generation quarks and leptons."	
1983	No award				
1984	Erwin L. Hahn		United States	"For his discovery of nuclear spin echoes and for the phenomenon of self-induced transparency."	
1984	Peter B. Hirsch		United Kingdom	"For his development of the utilization of the transmission electron microscope as a universal instrument to study the structure of crystalline matter."	
1984		Theodore H. Maiman	United States	"For his realization of the first operating laser, the pulsed three level ruby laser."	
1985		Conyers Herring	United States	"For their major contributions to the fundamental theory of solids, especially of the behavior of electrons in metals."	
1985	Philippe Nozières		France	"For their major contributions to the fundamental theory of solids, especially of the behavior of electrons in metals."	
1986	Albert J. Libchaber		United States	"For his brilliant experimental demonstration of the transition to turbulence and chaos in dynamical systems."	
1986	Mitchell J. Feigenbaum		United States	"For his pioneering theoretical studies demonstrating the universal character of non-linear systems, which has made possible the systematic study of chaos."	
1987		Bruno B. Rossi	United States	"For the discovery of extra-solar X-ray sources and the elucidation of their physical processes."	
1987		Riccardo Giacconi	United States	"For the discovery of extra-solar X-ray sources and the elucidation of their physical processes."	
1987	Herbert Friedman		United States	"For pioneering investigations in solar X-rays."	
1988		Roger Penrose	United Kingdom	"For their brilliant development of the theory of general relativity, in which they have shown the necessity for cosmological singularities and have elucidated the physics of black holes. In this work they have greatly enlarged our understanding of the origin and possible fate of the Universe."	
1988		Stephen W. Hawking	United Kingdom	"For their brilliant development of the theory of general relativity, in which they have shown the necessity for cosmological singularities and have elucidated the physics of black holes. In this work they have greatly enlarged our understanding of the origin and possible fate of the Universe."	
1989	No award				
1990		David J. Thouless	United States	"For a wide variety of pioneering contributions to our understanding of the organization of complex condensed matter systems, de Gennes especially for his work on macromolecular matter and liquid crystals and Thouless for his on disordered and low-dimensional systems."	
1990		Pierre-Gilles de Gennes	France	"For a wide variety of pioneering contributions to our understanding of the organization of complex condensed matter systems, de Gennes especially for his work on macromolecular matter and liquid crystals and Thouless for his on disordered and low-dimensional systems."	
1991		Maurice Goldhaber	United States	"For their separate seminal contributions to nuclear and particle physics, particularly those concerning the weak interactions involving leptons."	
1991		Valentine L. Telegdi	Switzerland	"For their separate seminal contributions to nuclear and particle physics, particularly those concerning the weak interactions involving leptons."	
1992		Joseph H. Taylor Jr.	United States	"For his discovery of an orbiting radio pulsar and its exploitation to verify the general theory of relativity to high precision."	
1993		Benoit B. Mandelbrot	United States	"By recognizing the widespread occurrence of fractals and developing mathematical tools for describing them, he has changed our view of nature."	
1994/5		Vitaly L. Ginzburg	Russia	"For his contributions to the theory of superconductivity and to the theory of high-energy processes in astrophysics."	
1994/5		Yoichiro Nambu	United States	"For his contribution to elementary particle theory, including recognition of the role played by spontaneous symmetry-breaking in analogy with superconductivity theory, and the discovery of the color symmetry of the strong interactions."	
1996/7		John A. Wheeler	United States	"For his seminal contributions to black holes physics, to quantum gravity, and to the theories of nuclear scattering and nuclear fission."	
1998		Michael V. Berry	United Kingdom	"For the discovery of quantum topological and geometrical phases, specifically the Aharonov-Bohm effect, the Berry phase, and their incorporation into many fields of physics"	
1998	Yakir Aharonov		Israel; United States	"For the discovery of quantum topological and geometrical phases, specifically the Aharonov-Bohm effect, the Berry phase, and their incorporation into many fields of physics"	
1999		Dan Shechtman	Israel	"For the experimental discovery of quasi-crystals, non periodic solids having long-range order, which inspired the exploration of a new fundamental state of matter."	
2000		Masatoshi Koshiba	Japan	"For their pioneering observations of astronomical phenomena by detection of neutrinos, thus creating the emerging field of neutrino astronomy."	
2000		Raymond Davis Jr.	United States	"For their pioneering observations of astronomical phenomena by detection of neutrinos, thus creating the emerging field of neutrino astronomy."	
2001	No award				
2002/3		Anthony J. Leggett	United States	"For key insights into the broad range of condensed matter physics: Leggett on superfluidity of the light helium isotope and macroscopic quantum phenomena; and Halperin on two- dimensional melting, disordered systems and strongly interacting electrons."	
2002/3		Bertrand Halperin	United States	"For key insights into the broad range of condensed matter physics: Leggett on superfluidity of the light helium isotope and macroscopic quantum phenomena; and Halperin on two- dimensional melting, disordered systems and strongly interacting electrons."	
2004		François Englert	Belgium	"For pioneering work that has led to the insight of mass generation, whenever a local gauge symmetry is realized asymmetrically in the world of sub-atomic particles."	
2004		Peter Higgs	United Kingdom	"For pioneering work that has led to the insight of mass generation, whenever a local gauge symmetry is realized asymmetrically in the world of sub-atomic particles."	
2004		Robert Brout	Belgium	"For pioneering work that has led to the insight of mass generation, whenever a local gauge symmetry is realized asymmetrically in the world of sub-atomic particles."	
2005	Daniel Kleppner		United States	"For groundbreaking work in atomic physics of hydrogenic systems, including research on the hydrogen maser, Rydberg atoms and Bose-Einstein condensation."	
2006/7		Albert Fert	France	"For their independent discovery of the giant magnetoresistance phenomenon (GMR), thereby launching a new field of research and applications known as spintronics, which utilizes the spin of the electron to store and transport information."	
2006/7		Peter Grünberg	Germany	"For their independent discovery of the giant magnetoresistance phenomenon (GMR), thereby launching a new field of research and applications known as spintronics, which utilizes the spin of the electron to store and transport information."	
2008	No award				
2009	No award				
2010		Alain Aspect	France	"For their fundamental conceptual and experimental contributions to the foundations of quantum physics, specifically an increasingly sophisticated series of tests of Bell’s inequalities or extensions there of using entangled quantum states."	
2010		Anton Zeilinger	Austria	"For their fundamental conceptual and experimental contributions to the foundations of quantum physics, specifically an increasingly sophisticated series of tests of Bell’s inequalities or extensions there of using entangled quantum states."	
2010		John F. Clauser	United States	"For their fundamental conceptual and experimental contributions to the foundations of quantum physics, specifically an increasingly sophisticated series of tests of Bell’s inequalities or extensions there of using entangled quantum states."	
2011		Harald Rose	Germany	"For their development of aberration-corrected electron microscopy, allowing the observation of individual atoms with picometer precision, thus revolutionizing materials science."	
2011		Knut Urban	Germany	"For their development of aberration-corrected electron microscopy, allowing the observation of individual atoms with picometer precision, thus revolutionizing materials science."	
2011		Maximilian Haider	Germany	"For their development of aberration-corrected electron microscopy, allowing the observation of individual atoms with picometer precision, thus revolutionizing materials science."	
2012		Jacob Bekenstein	Israel	"For his work on astronomical super-massive objects called ‘black holes’ that showed they can possess a statistical-thermodynamic property called entropy even though the internal dynamics could not be known. This work created an entire field of black hole dynamics which has become a cornerstone in the important theoretical physics areas of quantum gravity and strings."	
2013		Juan Ignacio Cirac	Spain	"For groundbreaking theoretical contributions to quantum information processing, quantum optics and the physics of quantum gases."	
2013		Peter Zoller	Austria	"For groundbreaking theoretical contributions to quantum information processing, quantum optics and the physics of quantum gases."	
2014	No award				
2015		James D. Bjorken	United States	"For predicting scaling in deep inelastic scattering, leading to identification of nucleon’s pointlike constituents."	
2015		Robert P. Kirshner	United States	"For forging the path to supernova cosmology through his observations and insights."	
2016		Yoseph Imry	Israel	"For pioneering studies of the physics of mesoscopic and random systems."	
2017		Didier Queloz	Switzerland; United Kingdom	"For the first discovery of an exoplanet orbiting a solar-type star."	
2017		Michel Mayor	Switzerland	"For the first discovery of an exoplanet orbiting a solar-type star."	
2018		Charles H. Bennett	United States	"For founding and advancing the fields of Quantum Cryptography and Quantum Teleportation."	
2018		Gilles Brassard	Canada	"For founding and advancing the fields of Quantum Cryptography and Quantum Teleportation."	
2019	No award				
2020	Rafi Bistritzer		Israel	"For pioneering theoretical and experimental work on twisted bilayer graphene."	
2020		Pablo Jarillo-Herrero	Spain	"For pioneering theoretical and experimental work on twisted bilayer graphene."	
2020		Allan H. MacDonald	United States	"For pioneering theoretical and experimental work on twisted bilayer graphene."	
2021		Giorgio Parisi	Italy	"For ground-breaking discoveries in disordered systems, particle physics and statistical physics."	
2022		Anne L'Huillier	Sweden	"For pioneering contributions to ultrafast laser science and attosecond physics."	
2022	Paul Corkum		Canada	"For pioneering contributions to ultrafast laser science and attosecond physics."	
2022		Ferenc Krausz	Germany	"For pioneering contributions to ultrafast laser science and attosecond physics."	
2023	No award				
2024		Martin Rees	United Kingdom	"For fundamental contributions to high-energy astrophysics, galaxies and structure formation, and cosmology."	
2025		Jainendra K. Jain	India / United States	"For advancing our understanding of the surprising properties of two-dimensional electron systems in strong magnetic fields"	
2025	Mordehai Heiblum		Israel	"For advancing our understanding of the surprising properties of two-dimensional electron systems in strong magnetic fields"	
2025	James P. Eisenstein		United States	"For advancing our understanding of the surprising properties of two-dimensional electron systems in strong magnetic fields"	
2026	Immanuel Bloch		Germany	"For transformative, widely applicable advances in the control of ultracold atomic systems."	
2026	Jun Ye		China / United States	"For transformative, widely applicable advances in the control of ultracold atomic systems."	

=== Number of laureates per country ===
Country	Number
United States	37
United Kingdom	7
Germany	7
Israel	6
France	4
Switzerland	3
Austria	2
Belgium	2
Canada	2
Spain	2
Italy	2
Japan	1
Netherlands	1
Russia	1
Sweden	1

== See also ==
- List of physics awards
