= Tsou =

Tsou or TSOU may refer to:

- the Tsou people, an Austronesian indigenous people of Taiwan
- the Tsou language, the language of the Tsou people
- Wade-Giles Romanization of Zou (simplified Chinese: 邹; traditional Chinese: 鄒)
- Peter Tsou, principal science staff member at the Jet Propulsion Laboratory
- Shih-Ching Tsou, Taiwan-born, actress, director, producer
- Tsou Hai-ying, the birth name of Jennifer Su (born 1968), South African radio and television personality
- Acronym of The Secret of Us, Gracie Abrams album
