= Maximilian Haider =

Austrian physicist (born 1950)

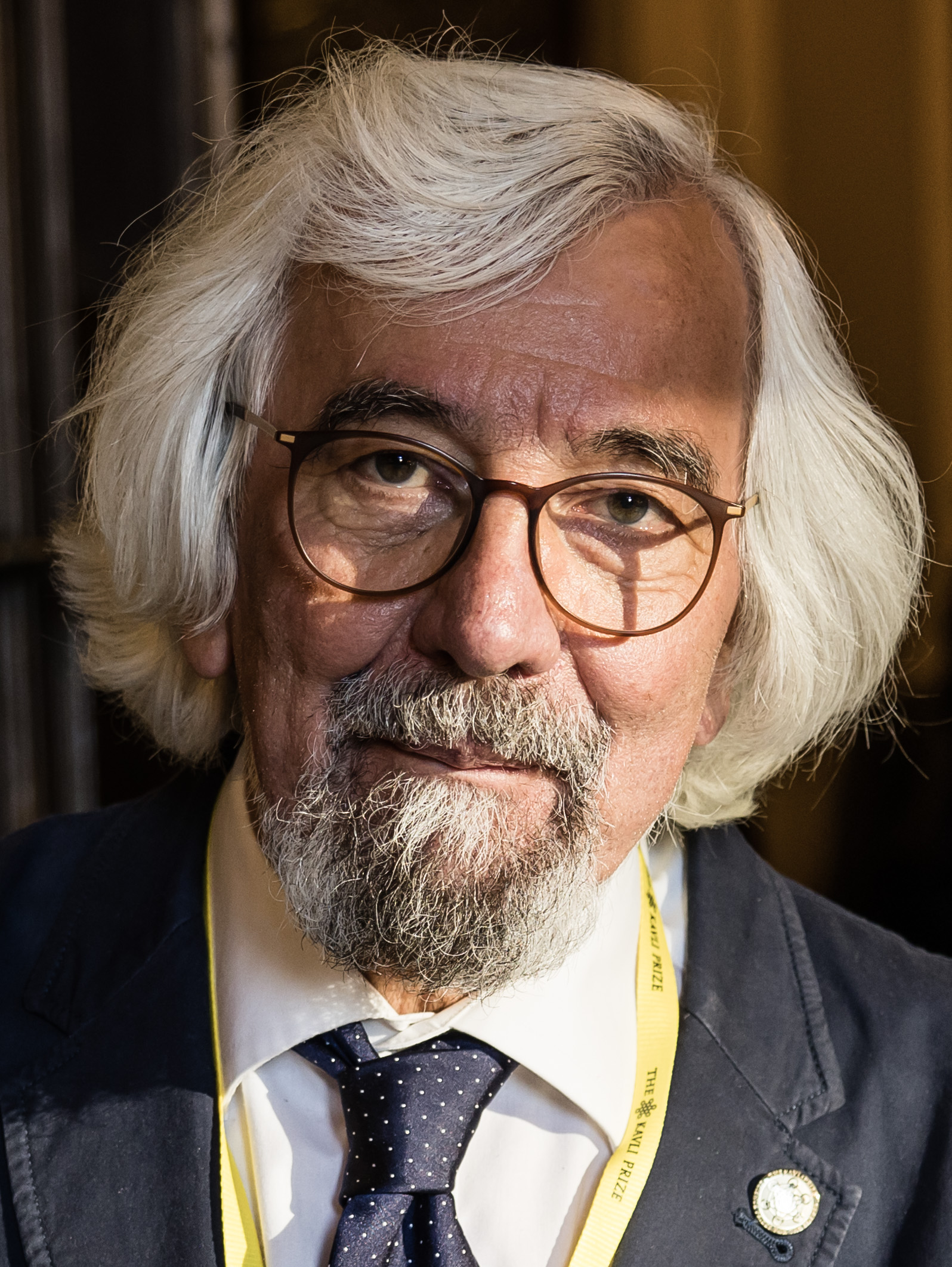
- Maximilian Haider (2022)
- Born: 23 January 1950 (age 76); Freistadt, Austria
- Education: Technische Universität Darmstadt
- Known for: Aberration-corrected transmission electron microscopy
- Awards: Wolf Prize in Physics (2011); BBVA Foundation Frontiers of Knowledge Award (2013); Kavli Prize (2020)
- Scientific career
- Fields: Electron microscopy
- Thesis: Entwurf, Bau und Erprobung eines korrigierten Elektronen-Energieverlust-Spektrometers mit grosser Dispersion und grossem Akzeptanzwinkel (1987)

Maximilian Haider (born 23 January 1950) is an Austrian physicist known for his contributions to electron microscopy. He obtained the 2011 Wolf Prize in Physics and the 2020 Kavli Prize in Nanoscience for the development of the aberration-corrected transmission electron microscopy in collaboration with Harald Rose and Knut Urban.

== Biography ==
Maximilian Haider was born in Freistadt, Austria in 1950.

He studied physics at the University of Kiel and the Technische Universität Darmstadt, where he received his doctoral degree with a thesis entitled "Design, construction and testing of a corrected electron energy loss spectrometer with large dispersion and a large acceptance angle" (in German: "Entwurf, Bau und Erprobung eines korrigierten Elektronen-Energieverlust-Spektrometers mit grosser Dispersion und grossem Akzeptanzwinkel") in 1987. In 1989 he became Group Leader within the Physical Instrumentation Program at the European Molecular Biology Laboratory (EMBL) where he had already performed some experiments during his doctoral studies.

He is honorary professor at the Karlsruhe Institute of Technology (KIT); co-founder, senior advisor and former president of Corrected Electron Optical Systems GmbH (CEOS), a German company that manufactures correction components for electron microscopes.

== Honors ==
He won the 2011 Wolf Prize in Physics, along with Harald Rose and Knut Urban, for his contributions to electron microscopy, specifically for the development of a device to correct electron-optical aberration using magnetic multipole lenses. Their work allowed electron microscopes to achieve a resolution of about 50 pm, comparable to the radius of the smallest atom. The three started working together in 1992. Haider built the first prototype and he is the founder (with Joachim Zach in 1996) of the German company Corrected Electron Optical Systems GmbH (CEOS), which manufactures and sells their invention.

In 2005 Haider, Zach and their company CEOS received the Dr.-Rudolf-Eberle Prize (Innovation prize from Baden-Württemberg).

Haider, Rose and Urban also received the Karl-Heinz-Beckurts Prize in 2006 and the Honda Prize in 2008.

In 2008 he became honorary professor at the Karlsruhe Institute of Technology (KIT).

A symposium on "Advances in Corrected Electron Microscopy in Materials Science and Biology" was held in honor of his 60th birthday on 19 February 2010 in Heidelberg.

Haider also received the 2013 BBVA Foundation Frontiers of Knowledge Award in Basic Sciences, along with Harald Rose and Knut Urban, for greatly enhancing the resolving power of electron microscopy by developing aberration-corrected electron optics, a breakthrough enabling subatomic precision.

In 2015 he also received the Honorary Fellowship of the Royal Microscopical Society (Hon FRMS) and the National Institute for Materials Science (NIMS) Award.

In 2020 he received the Kavli Prize in Nanoscience (together with Harald Rose and Knut Urban and Ondrej Krivanek).
