= NCEM =

NCEM may refer to:

- National Center for Electron Microscopy, in Berkeley, California, US
- National Centre for Early Music, in York, England
