= Haimei Zheng =

Chinese-American materials scientist

- Education: University of Maryland, College Park; Tianjin University; Chongqing University
- Scientific career
- Institutions: National Center for Electron Microscopy; Lawrence Berkeley National Laboratory
- Thesis: Growth and characterization of multiferroic BaTiO3-CoFe2O4 thin film nanostructures (2004)
- Website: Haimei Zheng group

Haimei Zheng is a Chinese-American materials scientist who is a senior scientist in Materials Sciences Division at the Lawrence Berkeley National Laboratory. She is an adjunct professor in Department of Materials Science and Engineering at the University of California, Berkeley. Her research considers the nucleation, nanoscale materials transformations, and dynamic phenomena at solid-liquid interfaces, which she studies by developing the advanced in situ electron microscopy techniques. She is a Fellow of the Materials Research Society.

== Early life and education ==
Zheng was born in China. She was an undergraduate student at Chongqing University and she got a master's degree at Tianjin University, where she majored both in materials science. She moved to the United States for graduate research and earned her doctorate degree at the University of Maryland, College Park. She was supervised by Ramamoorthy Ramesh and Lourdes Salamanca-Riba. Her Ph.D. research was on the growth and characterization of multiferroic thin film nanostructures. After completing her doctorate, Zheng was appointed a postdoctoral researcher at the University of California, Berkeley. She spent a year in Ramesh group at Berkeley on her extended Ph.D. research project before joining the National Center for Electron Microscopy at Lawrence Berkeley National Laboratory and Chemistry Department at the University of California, Berkeley, where she worked alongside Ulrich Dahmen and Paul Alivisatos. During her postdoctoral research, she studied the growth of nanocrystals in solution. She showed that whilst some crystals grow steadily, via a process of nucleation and aggregation, others grow in spurts. This fits and spurts like growth is driven by coalescence events.

== Research and career ==
Zheng was appointed Staff Scientist in materials sciences division at Lawrence Berkeley National Laboratory (LBNL) in 2010. She was promoted to Senior Staff Scientist in 2018. She has been an adjunct professor in department of materials science and engineering at the University of California, Berkeley since 2013. Her research considers the nucleation, nanoscale materials transformations, and dynamic phenomena at solid-liquid interfaces, especially those involve non-equilibrium processes, which she studies by developing and advancing the state-of-art in situ liquid phase electron microscopy, cryogenic electron microscopy and other techniques. Her research effort has led to over 140 publications, which can be found on the google scholar here

== Awards ==
- 2003 Materials Research Society Graduate Student Gold Medal Award
- 2011 United States Department of Energy Office of Science Early Career Award
- 2013 LBNL Director’s Award for Exceptional Scientific Achievement
- 2019 MRS Medal Award
- 2021 Elected a Fellow of the Materials Research Society

== Selected publications ==
- J Wang; J B Neaton; H Zheng; et al. (March 14, 2003). "Epitaxial BiFeO3 multiferroic thin film heterostructures". Science. 299 (5613): 1719–22. doi:10.1126/SCIENCE.1080615. ISSN 0036-8075. PMID 12637741. Wikidata Q28183486.
- Zheng H; Wang J; Samuel E. Lofland; et al. (January 1, 2004). "Multiferroic BaTiO3-CoFe2O4 Nanostructures". Science. 303 (5658): 661–663. doi:10.1126/SCIENCE.1094207. ISSN 0036-8075. PMID 14752158. Wikidata Q31039190.
- Haimei Zheng; Rachel K Smith; Young-Wook Jun; Christian Kisielowski; Ulrich Dahmen; Paul Alivisatos (June 1, 2009). "Observation of single colloidal platinum nanocrystal growth trajectories". Science. 324 (5932): 1309–1312. doi:10.1126/SCIENCE.1172104. ISSN 0036-8075. PMID 19498166. Wikidata Q56697951.
