= Ralph Nuzzo =

American chemist

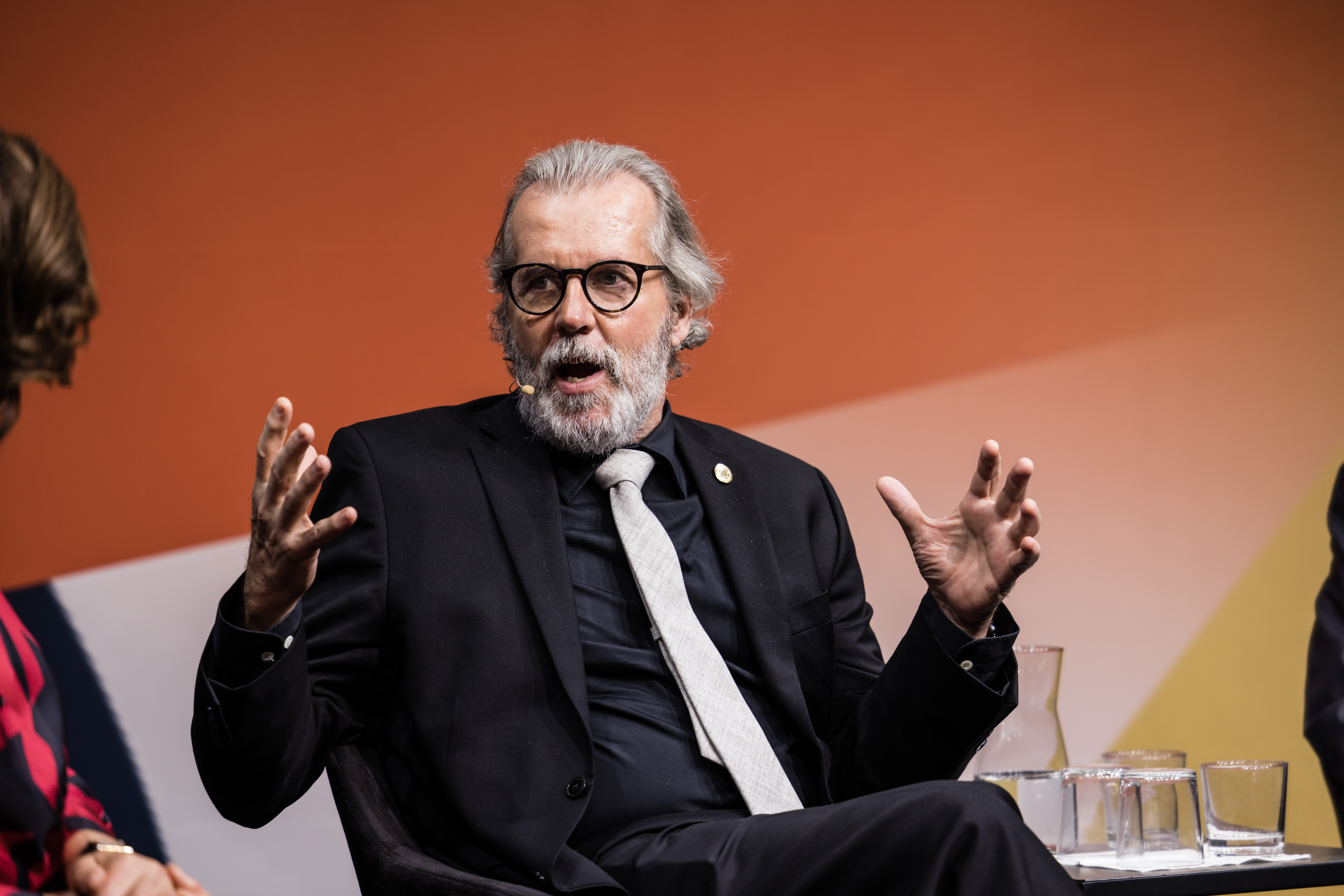
- Ralph Nuzzo in 2022
- Born: February 23, 1953 (age 73); Paterson, New Jersey
- Education: Rutgers University, MIT (PhD 1980)
- Known for: Methods of self-assembled monolayers
- Awards: Kavli Prize in Nanoscience
- Scientific career
- Fields: Material chemistry
- Workplaces: Bell Laboratories, University of Illinois at Urbana-Champaign

Ralph G. Nuzzo (born February 23, 1954 in Paterson, New Jersey) is an American chemist and professor. Nuzzo is a researcher in the chemistry of materials, including processes that occur at surfaces and interfaces. His work has led to new techniques for fabricating and manipulating materials at the nano scale level, including functional device structures for microelectronics, optics and chemical sensing.

== Biography ==
Nuzzo was a pioneer in the development of methods of self-assembled monolayers that have led to entirely new areas of surface chemistry with important extensions into physics, biology and materials, and with numerous applications ranging from bio-sensors to advanced electronics. His work has made important contributions to soft lithography – a low cost alternative to conventional photo-lithography for patterning circuits on microchips.

Nuzzo co-authored the paper on the "use of principles of physical organic chemistry to create functional surfaces based on self-assembled monolayers (SAMs)." The report is one of the "most highly cited papers in the Journal of the American Chemical Society history".

=== Education ===
Professor Nuzzo received his B.S. degree in chemistry from Rutgers University in 1976 and his Ph.D. degree in organic chemistry from the Massachusetts Institute of Technology in 1980. After completing his graduate studies, he accepted a position at Bell Laboratories, then a part of AT&T, where he held the title of distinguished member of the technical staff in materials research. He is currently the G. L. Clark Professor of Chemistry, and a professor of materials science and engineering at the University of Illinois at Urbana-Champaign.

=== Awards and achievements ===
2022 – Kavli Prize in Nanoscience
2021 – Member of the U. S. National Academy of Sciences
2011 – Fellow of the American Chemical Society
2007 – Fellow of the AVS
2005 – World Innovation Foundation, Fellow
2005 – American Academy of Arts and Sciences, Fellow
2003 – ACS Arthur Adamson Award for Distinguished Service in the Advancement of Surface Chemistry
2003 – Senior Editor of Langmuir
2003 – Distinguished Technical Staff Award, Bell Laboratories
