= Nion (company) =

American electron microscope manufacturer

Nion Company
- Company type: Subsidiary
- Industry: Scientific and Technical Instruments
- Founded: 1997
- Founders: Ondrej Krivanek, Niklas Dellby
- Headquarters: Kirkland, Washington
- Parent: Bruker
- Website: nion.com

Nion was a manufacturer of scanning transmission electron microscopes (STEMs) based in Kirkland, Washington State, USA. It was acquired by Bruker Corp. in 2024.

== History ==
Nion Co. was founded in 1997 in Washington State, USA, by Ondrej Krivanek and Niklas Dellby, with a mission to design and build advanced instruments for electron microscopy. Prior to founding Nion, Krivanek and Dellby built a working proof-of-principle aberration corrector for a STEM, in Cambridge UK. Following this success, Philip Batson of IBM TJ Watson Research Center asked them to build an aberration corrector for his STEM. Krivanek was a research professor at University of Washington at the time, and he and Dellby decided to start Nion Co. and build a redesigned corrector. The new corrector was delivered to IBM in June 2000, and demonstrated direct sub-Å resolution. Nion went on to supply the scientific community with correctors for 100 and 300 kV dedicated STEMs made by Vacuum Generators. Nion's 2004 Science article demonstrated 0.78 Å resolution and led to wide acceptance of aberration correction as the best way to achieve high spatial resolution in electron microscopy.

It soon became clear that a new, higher stability electron microscope was needed, built from the ground up so that resolutions of 0.5 Ångstroms and below could be reached. Nion developed such an instrument as its next project: a 100 kV aberration corrected, high-stability electron microscope called UltraSTEM, with resolution capability well below one Angstrom. The first deliveries of this instrument took place in 2008, to Cornell University and the SuperSTEM Daresbury Laboratory. A 200 kV version of this microscope was delivered to the Orsay STEM laboratory near Paris in 2010 and many other labs since. It is able to reach 0.5 Å resolution.

Nion went on to develop a monochromated STEM, with the first delivery to Arizona State University in 2013 and subsequent deliveries to Rutgers University, Daresbury SuperSTEM, and many other laboratories in the USA, Canada, Europe and China. In 2014, the ASU and Rutgers monochromatic STEMs showed that phonons could be detected with high spatial resolution in an electron microscope by ultra-high energy resolution electron energy loss spectroscopy (EELS). In 2018, Nion introduced a new EELS spectrometer, which improved the EELS resolution to 3 meV, and allowed the vibrations of single atoms to be studied.

Other innovations introduced by Nion and the ongoing operation under the Bruker umbrella include X-ray spectroscopy with single-atom sensitivity, imaging samples in a contamination-free ultra-high vacuum (UHV) environment, atomic resolution secondary electron imaging (SEI) of surfaces of samples held in UHV, and stable imaging at temperatures <10 K.

== Awards ==
In 2020, co-founder of Nion, Ondrej Krivanek, shared the Kavli Prize for Nanoscience for work creating the first aberration-corrected scanning transmission electron microscope with resolution below one ångstrom (0.1 nanometers).

== Acquisition ==
In January 2024, Nion was acquired by Bruker, which moved Bruker into the manufacture of electron microscopes.
