= Aleksandra Kornhauser Frazer =

Slovenian chemist (1926–2020)

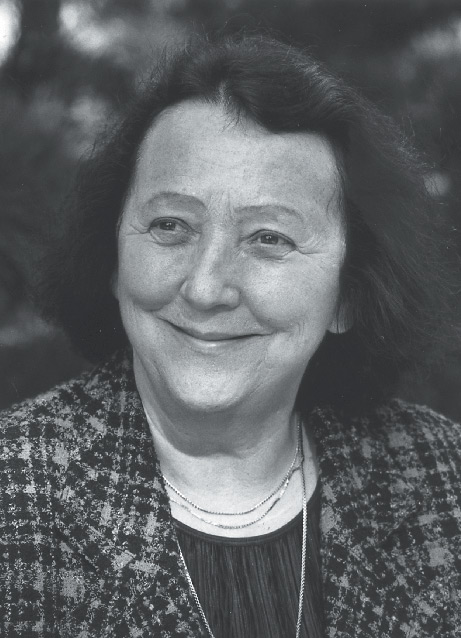
- Born: Aleksandra Caleari; 26 September 1926; Slovenia, Serbia-Croatia-Slovenia
- Died: 17 May 2020 (aged 93); Slovenia
- Scientific career
- Fields: Chemistry

Aleksandra Kornhauser Frazer (26 September 1926 – 17 May 2020) was a Slovenian chemist. She was a Professor of Chemistry at the Faculty of Natural Sciences and Engineering and Director at the International Centre for Chemical Studies, of the University of Ljubljana, Slovenia.

== Early life ==
Born as Aleksandra Caleari into a wealthy family with five siblings—her father owned what would later become the Jelovica company in Škofja Loka. The family lost their wealth during the Great Depression in the 1930s and she grew up in relative poverty. In 1940 during World War II, at the age of fifteen, she began running a youth organization to support partisans. Her father was imprisoned in the concentration camp in Begunje and the family were roped into forced labor but all survived the war. After briefly teaching in Kamnik and Domžale, she went to university in to study chemistry and graduated in 1963. Before studying in university she attended general educational course in mathematics and physics under the auspices of the People’s University. One of her professors there was the mathematician, Emilija Mlakar Branc, of whomAleksandra later said that had "initiated her into logical thinking for life".

== Career ==
Between 1954 and 1980, Frazer carried out extensive research into alkaloids and antibiotics for pharmaceutical companies. After 1980 she combined her chemical research with lecturing and was employed as a researcher for international organizations including the EU, UNDP, UNESCO, ILO, and the United States Environmental Protection Agency. In her later life she was notably involved with promoting clean technologies, and in 1999 she was the first woman scientist to be given the Honda Prize in Tokyo for her development of knowledge in this field.

In the 1960s and 1970s, she was active in politics, she also held the office of vice president of the Executive Council of Slovenia (during the Stane Kavčič era), where she was in charge of health, culture, science, and education sectors. After three years in office, she returned to academia.

Outside her native Slovenia she worked with universities in Switzerland, the UK and the US, and domestically she hosted over 60 international seminars and workshops. Frazer was a member of the United Nations Council, the World Academy of Art and Science and the Academia Europaea in London (since 1988) and was a recipient of the Laurent Lavoisier Medal of the Académie de Pharmacie and the Robert Brasted Memorial Award of the American Chemical Society, among others.

She was professionally active until the age of 90, when she concluded her term as the dean of Jožef Stefan International Postgraduate School. She received the Zois Prize for life-time achievements in 1997, the highest prize in the scientific field in Slovenia. She was also an honorary citizen of Ljubljana.

== Personal life ==
Frazer was married twice. Her first husband was Pavle Kornhauser, a Slovenian physician. Her second husband was British chemist, Malcolm Frazer, Professor of a Chemical Education at the University of East Anglia and subsequently chief executive of the Council for National Academic Awards. She kept both surnames of her husbands. She died in May 2020 at the age of 93.
