= Emilija Mlakar Branc =

Slovenian mathematician (1901–1989)

- Born: Emilija Mlakar; 10 November 1901; Ptuj, Austria-Hungary
- Died: 25 June 1989 (aged 87); Ptuj, Slovenia
- Occupations: Mathematician, university assistant, mathematics professor, physics professor, textbook author

Emilija Mlakar Branc (10 November 1901 – 25 June 1989) was a Slovenian mathematician, mathematics professor, and author of mathematics textbooks. In 1928, she became the first woman to graduate in mathematics from the University of Ljubljana. She was the author and co-author of several textbooks on geometry and solid geometry, which were popular and reprinted several times.

== Childhood ==
She was born on 10 November 1901 in Ptuj, where her family had moved in 1899 from Moškanjci. There, her mother Marjeta Beg had worked in an inn, while her father Štefan Mlakar worked as a stationmaster. She had twelve brothers and sisters, eight of whom reached adulthood. Among them was the later Austro-Hungarian army officer Albin Mlakar (1890–1946). Her parents sent all their surviving children to school, including Emilija, who graduated high school in 1924.

== Education ==
After completing primary and secondary education, she enrolled in the study of mathematics, pedagogical track, at the Faculty of Arts at University of Ljubljana; at that time, the faculty offered no other mathematics programme. During her studies, she lived as a lodger in an apartment in Ljubljana together with her younger brother, who was then a secondary-school student. At the faculty, one of her classmates was Janko Branc (1902–1963) from Kranjska Gora, later a lecturer in mathematics at the Faculty of Natural Sciences and Technology, whom she married on 14 July 1928. They had no children (at least none who survived to adulthood). In 1928 she became the first woman, and the thirteenth person overall, to graduate in mathematics from the University of Ljubljana.

== Career ==
After graduating university, she was employed in 1929 as a teacher at the State Real Gymnasium of Crown Prince Andrew in Ptuj (now Gimnazija Ptuj). In 1930 she became an assistant in physics at the Technical Faculty in Ljubljana, (Note: From 1919 to 1925, enrolment in the study of mathematics and physics was combined. Anyone who successfully completed it with a diploma examination, in which both subjects were equal main subjects, became both a mathematician and a physicist and had the right to teach both subjects in all classes of a gymnasium.) where she worked until 1933. In 1932, she passed the professorial examination at the University of Ljubljana and earned the title of professor.

In 1933, she was employed as a teacher of mathematics and physics at the State Real Gymnasium in Kranj (now the Gimnazija Kranj), where she remained for one year. In 1934, she was transferred to the State Classical Gymnasium in Ljubljana, where she worked as a teacher of mathematics and physics until 1937, when she was transferred to the State Women’s Real Gymnasium (now Gimnazija Poljane). There, in addition to teaching mathematics and physics, she also served as business manager and custodian of the physics collection, the teachers' library, and the library of the support society.

Between 1952 and 1955, as a member of the DMFA (Society of Mathematicians, Physicists and Astronomers of Slovenia), she also taught mathematics, alongside her full-time job, in a general educational course in mathematics and physics under the auspices of the People’s University. Among her students there was the later chemist Aleksandra Kornhauser Frazer, who later said that Emilija Mlakar Branc had "initiated her into logical thinking for life".

Between 1937 and 1952, Branc wrote, alone and with co-authors, four textbooks on geometry and two collections of exercises in solid geometry, which were popular in Slovenian lands and reprinted several times.

== Later life and death ==
In 1963, her husband died after a long illness. After retirement, she moved to live with relatives in Ptuj. She died on 25 June 1989 in Ptuj. She was buried at Rogoznica Cemetery in Ptuj.

== Bibliography ==
- Geometrija za tretji in četrti razred srednjih šol (Geometry for the Third and Fourth Grades of Secondary Schools, textbook, with Milan Ziegler and Albin Žabkar, Ljubljana, Jugoslovanska knjigarna, 1937)
- Geometrija za nižje razrede srednjih šol. Del 1. (Geometry for the Lower Grades of Secondary Schools, Part 1, textbook, with Slavica Jelenc, Milan Ziegler and Albin Žabkar, Ljubljana, Državna založba Slovenije, 1947)
- Geometrija za nižje razrede srednjih šol. Del 2. (Geometry for the Lower Grades of Secondary Schools, Part 2, textbook, with Slavica Jelenc, Milan Ziegler and Albin Žabkar, Ljubljana, Državna založba Slovenije, 1947)
- Geometrija za nižje razrede srednjih šol. Del 3. (Geometry for the Lower Grades of Secondary Schools, Part 3, textbook, with Slavica Jelenc, Milan Ziegler and Albin Žabkar, Ljubljana, Državna založba Slovenije, 1947)
- Zbirka nalog iz planimetrije in stereometrije: I. in II. del (Collection of Exercises in Plane Geometry and Solid Geometry: Parts I and II, exercise collection, with Franc Čemažar, Ljubljana, Državna založba Slovenije, 1947)
- Geometrija za nižje razrede srednjih šol: IV. del (Geometry for the Lower Grades of Secondary Schools, Part IV, textbook, with Slavica Jelenc, Milan Ziegler and Albin Žabkar, Ljubljana, Državna založba Slovenije, 1952)
- Vaje iz stereometrije (Exercises in Solid Geometry, exercise collection, Ljubljana, Državna založba Slovenije, 1952)
