= Ernst Ruska-Centre =

German research institute

Ernst Ruska-Centre for Microscopy and Spectroscopy with Electrons
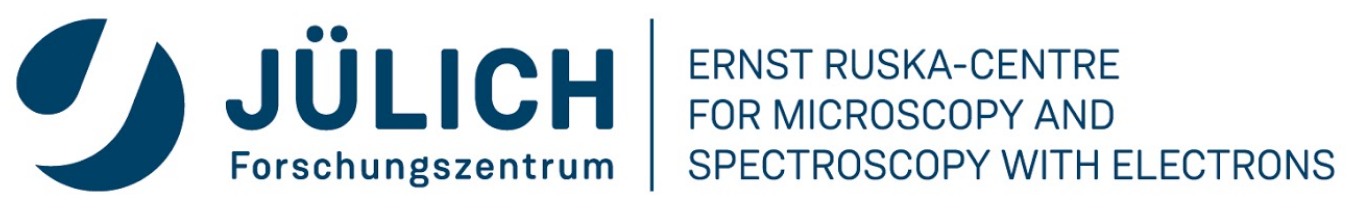
- Abbreviation: ER-C
- Established: 27 January 2004
- Type: Institute within Forschungszentrum Jülich and User Facility jointly operated with RWTH Aachen
- Location: Jülich Research Centre in Jülich, North Rhine-Westphalia, Germany
- Coordinates: 50°54′29″N 6°24′49″E
- Directors: Rafal E. Dunin-Borkowski, Joachim Mayer and Carsten Sachse
- Founding Director: Knut Urban
- Affiliations: Jülich Research Centre and RWTH Aachen University
- Staff: 50-100
- Website: www.fz-juelich.de/er-c

The Ernst Ruska-Centre for Microscopy and Spectroscopy with Electrons (ER-C) is an institute located on the campus of Forschungszentrum Jülich belonging to the Helmholtz Association of German Research Centres. It comprises three divisions: “Physics of Nanoscale systems”, “Materials Science and Technology” and “Structural Biology”.

The ER-C's main purposes are fundamental research in electron microscopy, focusing on method development and applications of high-resolution transmission electron microscopy (HRTEM) and scanning-transmission electron microscopy (STEM) in physics, chemistry and biology.

== History ==
As a competence platform, the ER-C was founded on 27 January 2004 through a contract signed by the chairman of Forschungszentrum Jülich Joachim Treusch and the rector of RWTH Aachen University Burkhard Rauhut. It was inaugurated on 18 May 2006 in the presence of members of the Ernst Ruska family, as well as representatives of the international electron microscopy community. On 1 January 2017, the ER-C attained the status of an independent scientific institute in Forschungszentrum Jülich. The ER-C is presently expanding further within the framework of the Research Infrastructure Roadmap of the German Federal Ministry of Education and Research (BMBF) under the designation ER-C 2.0. The ER-C thus creates incentives for companies dealing with novel materials and technologies to settle in the Rhenish mining area and contribute to the development of a competence region for innovative materials technologies and ultimately to the success of structural change.

== Instrumental resources ==
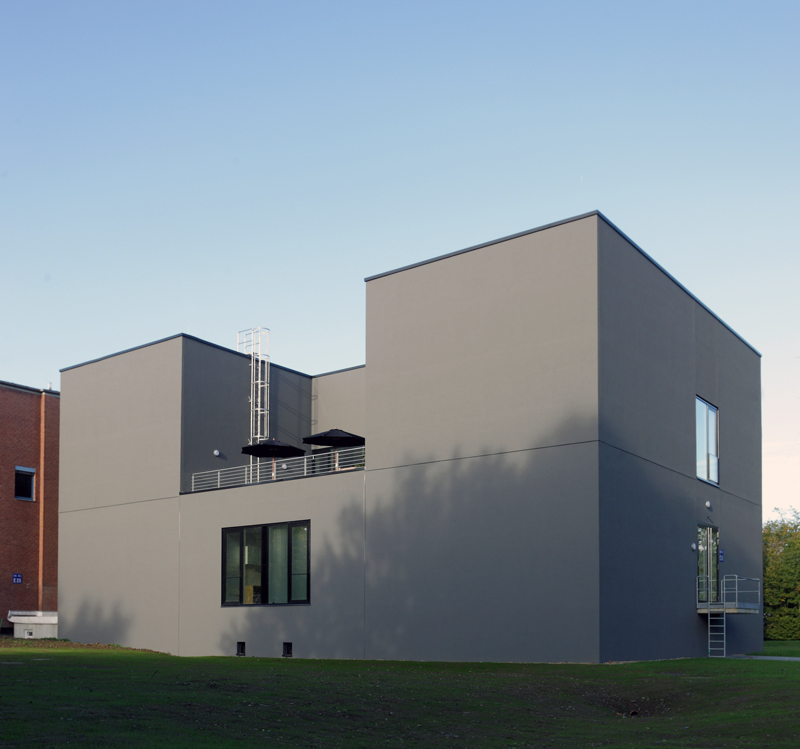
Laboratory annexe to the ER-C inaugurated on 29 September 2011 housing the PICO together with four other electron microscopes

The ER-C develops new methods and technologies in the field of electron microscopy, with a special focus on ultra-high-resolution techniques to study solid state materials, soft materials and biological systems. The ER-C houses conventional and state-of-the-art electron microscopes, ranging from standard scanning electron microscopes to highly specialised aberration corrected instruments offering sub-Å resolution imaging and spectroscopy, as well as quantitative measurements of electromagnetic field distributions using phase contrast techniques that include off-axis electron holography and 4D STEM. The ER-C currently operates seven aberration-corrected instruments.

On 29 February 2012, the ER-C inaugurated the first chromatic aberration corrected transmission electron microscope in Europe, which is designated “PICO” and is capable of resolving atomic positions in materials with a spatial resolution of 50 picometers and a precision approaching 1 picometer. It is also equipped with a monochromator, an electron biprism, an electron energy-loss spectrometer and a direct electron counting detector.

In situ and quantitative electromagnetic field measurements can be carried out using a spherical aberration corrected transmission electron microscope equipped with a large (11 mm) objective pole-piece gap, a double biprism system and a direct electron counting detector. The same microscope is used for ongoing instrumentation development, including ultra-high vacuum sample transfer, laser illumination, in situ magnetising and low temperature experiments.

Recently, cryo-electron microscopy (cryo-EM) became an integral part of the Ernst-Ruska Centre with state-of-the-art cryo-microscopes: 300 kV Titan Krios G4 (operational in Summer 2021) and 200 kV Talos Arctica including Gatan Bioquantum K3 detectors.

== Research programmes ==
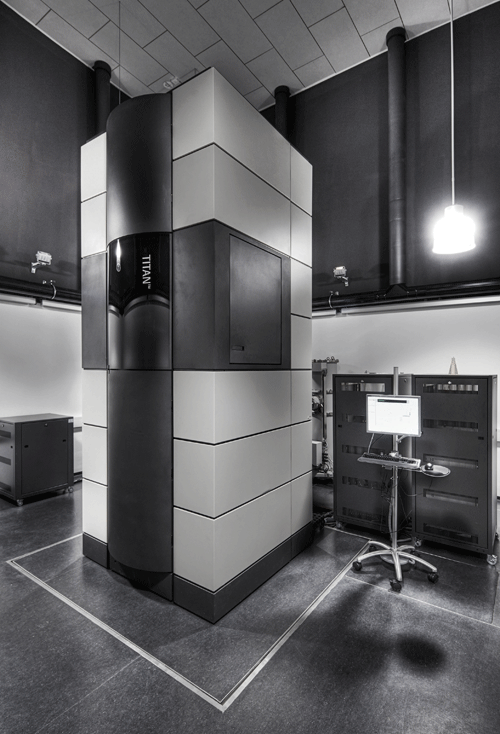
The FEI Titan 50-300 PICO is a double spherical aberration corrected and chromatic aberration corrected (S)TEM along with a monochromator, two electron biprisms and a direct electron detector after a post column energy filter. It allows a spatial resolution below 50 pm in both TEM and STEM modes.
