= Scherzer's theorem =

Theory of aberrations for electronic lenses

Scherzer's theorem is a theorem in the field of electron microscopy. It states that there is a limit of resolution for electronic lenses because of unavoidable aberrations.

German physicist Otto Scherzer found in 1936 that the electromagnetic lenses, which are used in electron microscopes to focus the electron beam, entail unavoidable imaging errors. These aberrations are of spherical and chromatic nature, that is, the spherical aberration coefficient C_{s} and the chromatic aberration coefficient C_{c} are always positive.

Scherzer solved the system of Laplace equations for electromagnetic potentials assuming the following conditions:

1. electromagnetic fields are rotationally symmetric,
2. electromagnetic fields are static,
3. there are no space charges.

He showed that under these conditions the aberrations that emerge degrade the resolution of an electron microscope up to one hundred times the wavelength of the electron. He concluded that the aberrations cannot be fixed with a combination of rotationally symmetrical lenses.

In his original paper, Scherzer summarized: "Chromatic and spherical aberration are unavoidable errors of the space charge-free electron lens. In principle, distortion (strain and twist) and (all types of) coma can be eliminated. Due to the inevitability of spherical aberration, there is a practical, but not a fundamental, limit to the resolving power of the electron microscope."

The resolution limit provided by Scherzer's theorem can be overcome by breaking one of the above-mentioned three conditions. Giving up rotational symmetry in electronic lenses helps in correcting spherical aberrations. A correction of the chromatic aberration can be achieved with time-dependent (i.e., non-static) electromagnetic fields (for example in particle accelerators).

Scherzer himself experimented with space charges (e.g., with charged foils), dynamic lenses, and combinations of lenses and mirrors to minimize aberrations in electron microscopes.
