= Denis Le Bihan =

Medical doctor, physicist, member of the Institut de France

- Born: 30 July 1957 (age 68)
- Awards: [Honda Prize, Louis-Jeantet Award, Rhein Foundation Award]

Denis Le Bihan (born 30 July 1957) is a medical doctor, physicist, member of the Institut de France (French Academy of sciences), member of the French Academy of Technologies and director since 2007 of NeuroSpin, an institution of the Atomic Energy and Alternative Energy Commission (CEA) in Saclay, dedicated to the study of the brain by magnetic resonance imaging (MRI) with a very high magnetic field. Denis Le Bihan has received international recognition for his outstanding work, introducing new imaging methods, particularly for the study of the human brain, as evidenced by the many international awards he has received, such as the Gold Medal of the International Society of Magnetic Resonance in Medicine (2001), the coveted Lounsbery Prize (US National Academy of Sciences and French Academy of sciences 2002), the Louis D. Prize from the Institut de France (with Stanislas Dehaene, 2003), the prestigious Honda Prize (2012), the Louis-Jeantet Prize (2014), the Rhein Foundation Award (with Peter Basser) (2021). His work has focused on the introduction, development and application of highly innovative methods, notably diffusion MRI.

== Biography ==
Denis Le Bihan studied medicine and physics in Paris. After an internship in neurosurgery, radiology and nuclear medicine, he obtained his doctorate in medicine in 1984 (University of Paris VI) with the specialty "radiology". He also follows a course in human biology (functional explorations of the nervous system, mathematical models in medicine). His training in physics focuses on nuclear physics and elementary particles. He obtained his doctorate in physics in 1987, his thesis focusing on a completely new method of magnetic resonance imaging that he introduced and developed (diffusion imaging and IVIM imaging (en) for IntraVoxel Incoherent Motion). In 1987, he joined the National Institutes of Health (NIH) in Bethesda, Maryland, USA, where he remained until 1994. This is where he continues to develop diffusion MRI, introducing diffusion tensor MRI (DTI) with Peter Basser. Denis Le Bihan joined the Frédéric Joliot Hospital Service of the CEA in 1994 to head the anatomical and functional neuroimaging laboratory. In 2000, he became Director of the Federal Institute for Research in Functional Neuroimaging (IFR 49). He presided over the founding and opening of NeuroSpin in 2007 and has been its director since then. Since 2005, Denis Le Bihan has also been a regular guest professor at Kyoto University (Human Brain Research Center).

NeuroSpin has been able to mobilize significant public funding to conduct innovative research in neurodegenerative disease imaging. As part of the Franco-German Iseult NeuroSpin project, CEA teams are in the process of finalizing the construction of a unique MRI scanner using a record magnetic field of 11.7 teslas, thanks to a magnet of more than 100 tons with an original design.

== Scientific works ==
Denis Le Bihan is particularly recognized for his pioneering work on diffusion MRI, a concept whose principles he established and demonstrated its potential, particularly in the medical field during the 1980s. Since then, Denis Le Bihan has continued to develop and perfect the method, and has further extended its fields of application. Diffusion MRI is used worldwide to study the anatomy of our brain, its connections and functioning. In medicine, major neurological applications include acute stroke and white matter disorders, including psychiatric disorders. Diffusion MRI is also of great importance outside the brain for the detection and monitoring of cancers and metastases.

=== Diffusion MRI and Stroke ===
Diffusion MRI allows us to detect in the context of the emergency, a few hours after the onset of a stroke, the area of the brain that is dying because it is deprived of blood flow when a blood vessel has been obliterated by a clot. The consequences of stroke are formidable: it is the third leading cause of death, and in 30% of cases it leaves severe functional sequelae (hemiplegia, speech disorders) in patients who become unable to support themselves. Stroke is by far the leading source of disability in the long term, with significant social and economic consequences. Diffusion MRI has led to the urgent and accurate identification of stroke and the development of drugs that, injected in the very first hours following stroke, can dissolve the clot and immediately clear up symptoms. The vast majority of MRI scanners manufactured and installed worldwide are equipped with the diffusion MRI method introduced by Denis Le Bihan.

=== Intracerebral connectivity ===
The brain contains about 100 billion neurons, our grey matter, which are connected to each other at a rate of 1,000 to 10,000 connections per neuron through extensions called axons that constitute the fibres of the white matter. The diffusion MRI made it possible, for the first time, to produce 3D images of these connections (tractography), in a way that is totally harmless to patients (just lie down for about ¼ hours in the MRI scanner). The principle is based on the fact that the diffusion of water is slower perpendicular to the fibres. It is therefore sufficient to obtain images of the diffusion of water in different directions to account for the orientation of the fibres, which Denis Le Bihan's team first showed in 1991. With the diffusion tensor MRI technique (DTI) developed by Denis Le Bihan and Peter Basser at the NIH in 1992 and its variants developed since then (high angular resolution methods), it is now possible to obtain atlases of intracerebral connections with very high accuracy. Diffusion MRI can therefore not only diagnose and study white matter fibre disorders (such as multiple sclerosis), but also subtle connection abnormalities in neural circuits. These abnormalities that appear very early in life may reflect some functional disorders (dyslexia) or psychiatric conditions (schizophrenia, autism). At the other end of life, normal or pathological aging (neurodegenerative diseases, such as Alzheimer's disease) is also accompanied by a rearrangement of brain connections that diffusion MRI shows.

=== Diffusion MRI and cancer ===
Diffusion MRI is becoming increasingly important at the beginning of the 21st century in the exploration of cancers, particularly breast, prostate and liver cancers. While diffusion MRI is mainly used for the brain, Denis Le Bihan's first trials actually focused on the liver to identify tumours and distinguish them from vascular malformations. The proliferation of cells in cancers and metastases are all obstacles to the diffusion of water, which slows down. Diffusion MRI therefore makes it possible to identify these cancerous lesions and to judge the effect of treatments (such as chemotherapy) well before clinical improvement, which makes it possible to adapt treatment very early in the absence of a positive response.

== Non-professional activities ==
Denis Le Bihan is passionate about music and an experienced amateur pianist who occasionally gives concerts on a voluntary basis. He is also an experienced photographer: he exhibited an extract of his works (photos of Kyoto) in November 2011 at the French Institute of Japan – Kansai in honour of the victims of the Pacific Coast earthquake at Tōhoku He is also at the origin of a weather forecast website (updated daily with a 6-day window, for the moment for the West Paris region) with original forecasting tools that he himself has developed since the age of 12.

== International recognition ==
As a pioneer in his field, Denis Le Bihan has received many awards and recognitions during his career.

- 2022: Antoine Béclère Medal
- 2021: Technology Award of the Eduard Rhein Foundation
- 2014: Louis-Jeantet Prize for Medicine
- 2012: Honda Prize
- 2011: European Congress of Radiology, Opening Lecturer
- 2010: Holst Award, University of Eindhoven/Philips Research
- 2010: JA Vezina Award, Elected Honorary Member of the Canadian Society of French-speaking Radiology
- 2009: Béclère Honorary Lecturer, Medal for the 100th anniversary of the French Society of Radiology
- 2009: Fellow of the European Society for Magnetic Resonance in Medicine and Biology
- 2004: Elected Honorary Member of the American Society of Neuroradiology
- 2003: Louis D. Foundation Prize, Institut de France
- 2002: Lounsbery Prize, US National Academy of Sciences and French Academy of sciences
- 2002: Elected member of the European Academy of Sciences
- 2001: Gold Medal, International Society of Magnetic Resonance in Medicine
- 2000: Fellow, International Society of Magnetic Resonance in Medicine
- 1995: Kodak-Landucci Prize, Laureate of the French Academy of sciences, Paris
- 1994, 1993, 1992, 1990: Editor's Recognition Award, with Distinction for Outstanding Review in Radiology
- 1994: Award of the European Society of Magnetic Resonance in Medicine and Biology
- 1993: Cum Laude Award, American Society of Neuroradiology
- 1993: Magna Cum Laude, Society of Magnetic Resonance Imaging
- 1991: Sylvia Sorkin Greenfield Award (best publication in Medical Physics, American Association of Physicists in Medicine (AAPM))
- 1991: Cum Laude Citation, Society of Magnetic Resonance Imaging
- 1989: Foucault Prize, French Physics Society
- 1989: Magna Cum Laude Award, Radiological Society of North America
- 1987: Magnetic Resonance Evaluation College Award
- 1986: René Djindjian Prize, French Society of Neuroradiology
- 1986: Cum Laude Award, Radiological Society of North America
- 1985: Michel Katz Prize, French Society of Radiology

== Bibliography ==
Denis Le Bihan is a prolific author with more than 300 publications in peer-reviewed scientific journals and a large number of book chapters. He is also the inventor or co-inventor for a dozen patents.

Scientific publications of a historical nature

- Le Bihan, D; Breton, E; Lallemand, D; Grenier, P; Cabanis, E; Laval-Jeantet, M (1986). "MR imaging of intravoxel incoherent motions: application to diffusion and perfusion in neurologic disorders". Radiology. 161 (2): 401–407. doi:10.1148/radiology.161.2.3763909. ISSN 0033-8419. PMID 3763909. Establishes the foundation of diffusion MRI and its potential, showing the world's first images of water diffusion in patients' brains.
- Le Bihan, D; Breton, E; Lallemand, D; Aubin, M L; Vignaud, J; Laval-Jeantet, M (1988). "Separation of diffusion and perfusion in intravoxel incoherent motion MR imaging". Radiology. 168 (2): 497–505. doi:10.1148/radiology.168.2.3393671. ISSN 0033-8419. PMID 3393671. Establishes the foundation of IntraVoxel Incoherent Motion (IVIM) imaging to obtain infusion images from diffusion MRI. Accompanied by a very complimentary editorial (Dixon T. Separation of diffusion and infusion in intravoxel incoherent motion MR imaging: a modest proposal with tremendous potential. Radiology, August 1988 168:2 566–567)
- Basser, P.J.; Mattiello, J.; LeBihan, D. (1994). "MR diffusion tensor spectroscopy and imaging". Biophysical Journal. 66 (1): 259–267. Bibcode:1994BpJ....66..259B. doi:10.1016/S0006-3495(94)80775-1. PMC 1275686. PMID 8130344. Establishes the principles of MRI of the diffusion tensor.
- Basser, P.J.; Mattiello, J.; Lebihan, D. (1994). "Estimation of the Effective Self-Diffusion Tensor from the NMR Spin Echo". Journal of Magnetic Resonance, Series B. 103 (3): 247–254. Bibcode:1994JMRB..103..247B. doi:10.1006/jmrb.1994.1037. PMID 8019776. Establishes the principles of MRI of the diffusion tensor.
- Le Bihan, Denis; Mangin, Jean-François; Poupon, Cyril; Clark, Chris A.; Pappata, Sabina; Molko, Nicolas; Chabriat, Hughes (2001). "Diffusion tensor imaging: Concepts and applications". Journal of Magnetic Resonance Imaging. 13 (4): 534–546. doi:10.1002/jmri.1076. ISSN 1053-1807. PMID 11276097.

Books

- Le Bihan, D., Imagerie par Résonance Magnétique : Bases Physiques. Masson, Paris, 1984. (1st book on the principles of MRI in French)
- Bihan, Denis Le (1995). Diffusion and Perfusion Magnetic Resonance Imaging. New York: Raven Press (ID). ISBN 978-0-7817-0244-7. (1st reference book on diffusion MRI and functional MRI).
- Fukuyama, Hidenao; Bihan, Denis Le (30 November 2010). Water. Singapore: Pan Stanford Publishing. ISBN 978-981-4267-52-6.
- Bihan, Denis Le (27 September 2012). Cerveau de cristal (Le) (in French). Paris: Odile Jacob. ISBN 978-2-7381-2527-9. (book on neuroimaging, simply explaining the principles and potential, with many personal historical references)
- Bihan, Denis Le (30 November 2014). Looking Inside the Brain. Princeton: Princeton University Press. ISBN 978-0-691-16061-0.
- Le Bihan, Denis; Iima, Mami; Federau, Christian; Sigmund, Eric E. (5 November 2018). Intravoxel Incoherent Motion (IVIM) MRI: Principles and Applications. Jenny Stanford Publishing. doi:10.1201/9780429427275. ISBN 978-0-429-42727-5.
- Iima, Mami; Partridge, Savannah; Bihan, Denis Le (2022). Diffusion MRI of the Breast. Elsevier. ISBN 978-0-323-79702-3.
- Bihan, Denis Le (30 September 2022). Einstein's Error. Odile Jacob. ISBN 978-2-415-00088-2.
