= Kavli Prize =

The Kavli Prize
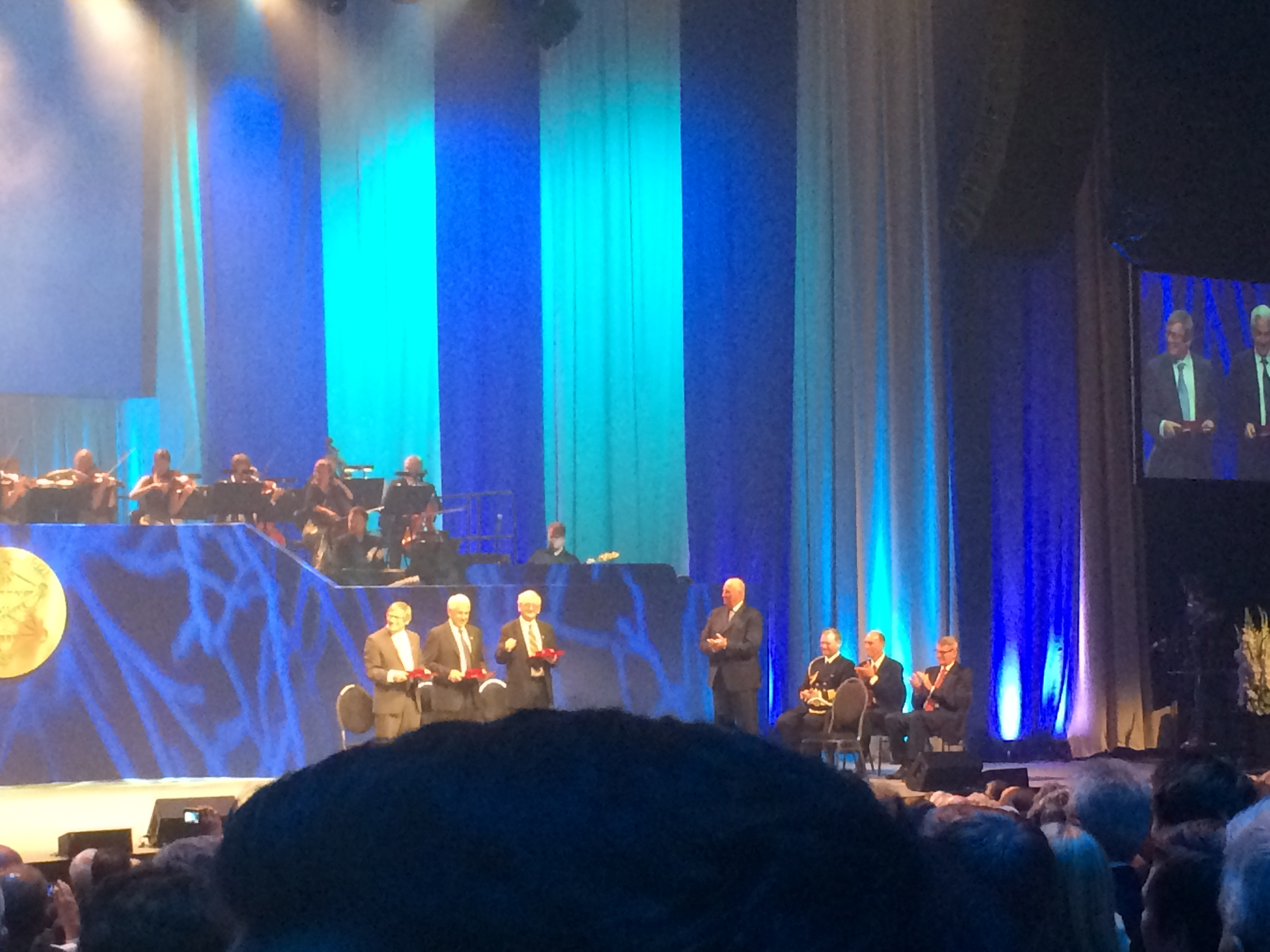
- Awarded for: outstanding contributions in Astrophysics, Nanoscience, and Neuroscience.
- Country: Norway
- Presented by: Norwegian Academy of Science and Letters; The Kavli Foundation; Norwegian Ministry of Education and Research
- Rewards: A gold medal, a scroll, and a monetary award of US$1,000,000
- First award: 2008
- Number of laureates: 21 prizes to 54 laureates (as of 2021)
- Website: http://www.kavliprize.no

The Kavli Prize was established in 2005 as a joint venture of the Norwegian Academy of Science and Letters, the Norwegian Ministry of Education and Research, and the Kavli Foundation. It honors, supports, and recognizes scientists for outstanding work in the fields of astrophysics, nanoscience and neuroscience. Three prizes are awarded every second year. Each of the three Kavli Prizes consists of a gold medal, a scroll, and a cash award of US$1,000,000. The medal has a diameter of 70 millimetres (2.8 in), a thickness of 5 millimetres (0.20 in), and weighs 311 grams (11.0 oz).

The first Kavli Prizes were awarded on 9 September 2008 in Oslo, presented by Haakon, Crown Prince of Norway.

== Selection committees ==
The Norwegian Academy of Science and Letters appoints three prize committees consisting of leading international scientists after receiving recommendations made from the following organisations:

- Chinese Academy of Sciences
- French Academy of Sciences
- Max Planck Society
- United States National Academy of Sciences
- Norwegian Academy of Science and Letters
- Royal Society

== Laureates ==
=== Astrophysics ===
Year	Laureate	Institution	Country	Citation
2008	Maarten Schmidt	California Institute of Technology	(Netherlands)	"for their seminal contributions to understanding the nature of quasars"
2008	Donald Lynden-Bell	Cambridge University	(United Kingdom)	"for their seminal contributions to understanding the nature of quasars"
2010	Jerry E. Nelson	Lick Observatory, University of California, Santa Cruz	(United States)	"for their contributions to the development of giant telescopes"
2010	Raymond N. Wilson	European Southern Observatory, Garching	(United Kingdom)	"for their contributions to the development of giant telescopes"
2010	James Roger Angel	Steward Observatory, University of Arizona	(United States)	"for their contributions to the development of giant telescopes"
2012	David C. Jewitt	University of California Los Angeles	(United Kingdom) (United States)	"for discovering and characterizing the Kuiper Belt and its largest members, work that led to a major advance in the understanding of the history of our planetary system"
2012	Jane X. Luu	Lincoln Laboratory, Massachusetts Institute of Technology	(Vietnam) (United States)	"for discovering and characterizing the Kuiper Belt and its largest members, work that led to a major advance in the understanding of the history of our planetary system"
2012	Michael E. Brown	California Institute of Technology	(United States)	"for discovering and characterizing the Kuiper Belt and its largest members, work that led to a major advance in the understanding of the history of our planetary system"
2014	Alan H. Guth	Massachusetts Institute of Technology	(United States)	"for pioneering the theory of cosmic inflation"
2014	Andrei D. Linde	Stanford University	(Russia) (United States)	"for pioneering the theory of cosmic inflation"
2014	Alexei A. Starobinsky	Landau Institute for Theoretical Physics	(Russia)	"for pioneering the theory of cosmic inflation"
2016	Ronald W.P. Drever	California Institute of Technology	(United Kingdom)	"for the direct detection of gravitational waves"
2016	Kip S. Thorne	California Institute of Technology	(United States)	"for the direct detection of gravitational waves"
2016	Rainer Weiss	Massachusetts Institute of Technology	(Germany) (United States)	"for the direct detection of gravitational waves"
2018	Ewine van Dishoeck	Leiden University	(Netherlands)	"for her combined contributions to observational, theoretical, and laboratory astrochemistry, elucidating the life cycle of interstellar clouds and the formation of stars and planets"
2020	Andrew Fabian	University of Cambridge	(United Kingdom)	"for his groundbreaking research in the field of observational X-ray astronomy, covering a wide range of topics from gas flows in clusters of galaxies to supermassive black holes at the heart of galaxies"
2022	Roger Ulrich	University of California, Los Angeles	(United States)	"for their pioneering work and leadership in the development of helio- and asteroseismology"
2022	Jørgen Christensen-Dalsgaard	Aarhus University	(Denmark)	"for their pioneering work and leadership in the development of helio- and asteroseismology"
2022	Conny Aerts	KU Leuven	(Belgium)	"for their pioneering work and leadership in the development of helio- and asteroseismology"
2024	Sara Seager	Massachusetts Institute of Technology	(Canada) (United States)	"for their ground-breaking work on the discovery and characterization of extra-solar planets and their atmospheres"
2024	David Charbonneau	Harvard University	(Canada) (United States)	"for their ground-breaking work on the discovery and characterization of extra-solar planets and their atmospheres"
2026	Vasily Belokurov	University of Cambridge	(United Kingdom)	"for uncovering the fossil evidence of past mergers proving that the Milky Way galaxy was built through hierarchical accretion"
2026	Amina Helmi	University of Groningen	(Argentina) (Netherlands)	"for uncovering the fossil evidence of past mergers proving that the Milky Way galaxy was built through hierarchical accretion"
2026	Rodrigo Ibata	University of Strasbourg	(France) (United Kingdom)	"for uncovering the fossil evidence of past mergers proving that the Milky Way galaxy was built through hierarchical accretion"

=== Nanoscience ===
Year	Laureate	Institution	Country	Citation
2008	Louis E. Brus	Columbia University	(United States)	"for their large impact in the development of the nanoscience field of the zero and one dimensional nanostructures in physics, chemistry and biology"
2008	Sumio Iijima	Meijo University	(Japan)	"for their large impact in the development of the nanoscience field of the zero and one dimensional nanostructures in physics, chemistry and biology"
2010	Donald Eigler	IBM Almaden Research Center	(United States)	"for their development of unprecedented methods to control matter on the nanoscale"
2010	Nadrian C. Seeman	New York University	(United States)	"for their development of unprecedented methods to control matter on the nanoscale"
2012	Mildred S. Dresselhaus	Massachusetts Institute of Technology	(United States)	"for her pioneering contributions to the study of phonons, electron-phonon interactions, and thermal transport in nanostructures"
2014	Thomas W. Ebbesen	University of Strasbourg	(Norway) (France)	"for transformative contributions to the field of nano-optics that have broken long-held beliefs about the limitations of the resolution limits of optical microscopy and imaging"
2014	Stefan W. Hell	Max Planck Institute for Biophysical Chemistry	(Germany) (Romania)	"for transformative contributions to the field of nano-optics that have broken long-held beliefs about the limitations of the resolution limits of optical microscopy and imaging"
2014	John B. Pendry	Imperial College London	(United Kingdom)	"for transformative contributions to the field of nano-optics that have broken long-held beliefs about the limitations of the resolution limits of optical microscopy and imaging"
2016	Gerd Binnig	IBM Zurich Research Laboratory	(Germany)	"for the invention and realization of atomic force microscopy, a breakthrough in measurement technology and nanosculpting that continues to have a transformative impact on nanoscience and technology"
2016	Christoph Gerber	University of Basel	(Switzerland)	"for the invention and realization of atomic force microscopy, a breakthrough in measurement technology and nanosculpting that continues to have a transformative impact on nanoscience and technology"
2016	Calvin Quate	Stanford University	(United States)	"for the invention and realization of atomic force microscopy, a breakthrough in measurement technology and nanosculpting that continues to have a transformative impact on nanoscience and technology"
2018	Emmanuelle Charpentier	Max Planck Institute for Infection Biology	(France) (Germany)	"for the invention of CRISPR-Cas9, a precise nanotool for editing DNA, causing a revolution in biology, agriculture, and medicine"
2018	Jennifer Doudna	University of California, Berkeley	(United States)	"for the invention of CRISPR-Cas9, a precise nanotool for editing DNA, causing a revolution in biology, agriculture, and medicine"
2018	Virginijus Šikšnys	Vilnius University	(Lithuania)	"for the invention of CRISPR-Cas9, a precise nanotool for editing DNA, causing a revolution in biology, agriculture, and medicine"
2020	Harald Rose	Universität Ulm	(Germany)	"for sub-ångström resolution imaging and chemical analysis using electron beams"
2020	Maximilian Haider	CEOS GmbH	(Austria)	"for sub-ångström resolution imaging and chemical analysis using electron beams"
2020	Knut Urban	Forschungszentrum Jülich	(Germany)	"for sub-ångström resolution imaging and chemical analysis using electron beams"
2020	Ondrej Krivanek	Nion Co	(United Kingdom) (Czech Republic)	"for sub-ångström resolution imaging and chemical analysis using electron beams"
2022	Jacob Sagiv	Weizmann Institute of Science	(Israel)	"for Self-Assembled Monolayers (SAMs) on solid substrates; molecular coatings to control surface properties"
2022	Ralph Nuzzo	University of Illinois Urbana-Champaign	(United States)	"for Self-Assembled Monolayers (SAMs) on solid substrates; molecular coatings to control surface properties"
2022	David Allara	Pennsylvania State University	(United States)	"for Self-Assembled Monolayers (SAMs) on solid substrates; molecular coatings to control surface properties"
2022	George M. Whitesides	Harvard University	(United States)	"for Self-Assembled Monolayers (SAMs) on solid substrates; molecular coatings to control surface properties"
2024	Robert S. Langer	Koch Institute for Integrative Cancer Research, Massachusetts Institute of Technology	(United States)	"for pioneering work integrating synthetic nanoscale materials with biological function for biomedical applications"
2024	Armand Paul Alivisatos	University of Chicago	(United States)	"for pioneering work integrating synthetic nanoscale materials with biological function for biomedical applications"
2024	Chad A. Mirkin	Northwestern University	(United States)	"for pioneering work integrating synthetic nanoscale materials with biological function for biomedical applications"
2026	Eva Andrei	Rutgers University	(United States)	"for foundational work that established the field of Twistronics"
2026	Pablo Jarillo-Herrero	Massachusetts Institute of Technology	(Spain) (United States)	"for foundational work that established the field of Twistronics"
2026	Allan H. MacDonald	University of Texas at Austin	(Canada) (United States)	"for foundational work that established the field of Twistronics"

=== Neuroscience ===
Year	Laureate	Institution	Country	Citation
2008	Sten Grillner	Karolinska Institute	(Sweden)	"for discoveries on the developmental and functional logic of neuronal circuits"
2008	Thomas Jessell	Columbia University	(United Kingdom) (United States)	"for discoveries on the developmental and functional logic of neuronal circuits"
2008	Pasko Rakic	Yale University School of Medicine	(Serbia) (United States)	"for discoveries on the developmental and functional logic of neuronal circuits"
2010	Richard H. Scheller	Genentech	(United States)	"for discovering the molecular basis of neurotransmitter release"
2010	Thomas C. Südhof	Stanford University School of Medicine	(Germany)	"for discovering the molecular basis of neurotransmitter release"
2010	James E. Rothman	Yale University	(United States)	"for discovering the molecular basis of neurotransmitter release"
2012	Cornelia Isabella Bargmann	Rockefeller University	(United States)	"for elucidating basic neuronal mechanisms underlying perception and decision"
2012	Winfried Denk	Max Planck Institute for Medical Research	(Germany)	"for elucidating basic neuronal mechanisms underlying perception and decision"
2012	Ann M. Graybiel	Massachusetts Institute of Technology	(United States)	"for elucidating basic neuronal mechanisms underlying perception and decision"
2014	Brenda Milner	Montreal Neurological Institute, McGill University	(Canada)	"for the discovery of specialized brain networks for memory and cognition"
2014	John O’Keefe	University College London	(United Kingdom)	"for the discovery of specialized brain networks for memory and cognition"
2014	Marcus E. Raichle	Washington University in St. Louis	(United States)	"for the discovery of specialized brain networks for memory and cognition"
2016	Eve Marder	Brandeis University	(United States)	"for the discovery of mechanisms that allow experience and neural activity to remodel brain function"
2016	Michael M. Merzenich	University of California, San Francisco	(United States)	"for the discovery of mechanisms that allow experience and neural activity to remodel brain function"
2016	Carla J. Shatz	Stanford University	(United States)	"for the discovery of mechanisms that allow experience and neural activity to remodel brain function"
2018	A. James Hudspeth	Rockefeller University	(United States)	"for their scientific discoveries of the molecular and neural mechanisms of hearing"
2018	Robert Fettiplace	University of Wisconsin–Madison	(United Kingdom) (United States)	"for their scientific discoveries of the molecular and neural mechanisms of hearing"
2018	Christine Petit	Collège de France	(France)	"for their scientific discoveries of the molecular and neural mechanisms of hearing"
2020	David Julius	University of California, San Francisco	(United States)	"for their transformative discovery of receptors for temperature and pressure".
2020	Ardem Patapoutian	Scripps Research and Howard Hughes Medical Investigator	(Lebanon) (United States)	"for their transformative discovery of receptors for temperature and pressure".
2022	Jean-Louis Mandel	University of Strasbourg	(France)	"for pioneering the discovery of genes underlying a range of brain disorders"
2022	Harry T. Orr	University of Minnesota Medical School	(United States)	"for pioneering the discovery of genes underlying a range of brain disorders"
2022	Huda Zoghbi	Baylor College of Medicine	(Lebanon) (United States)	"for pioneering the discovery of genes underlying a range of brain disorders"
2022	Christopher A. Walsh	Harvard Medical School	(United States)	"for pioneering the discovery of genes underlying a range of brain disorders"
2024	Nancy Kanwisher	Massachusetts Institute of Technology	(United States)	"for the discovery of a highly localized and specialized system for representation of faces in human and non-human primate neocortex"
2024	Winrich Freiwald	Rockefeller University	(Germany) (United States)	"for the discovery of a highly localized and specialized system for representation of faces in human and non-human primate neocortex"
2024	Doris Ying Tsao	University of California, Berkeley	(United States)	"for the discovery of a highly localized and specialized system for representation of faces in human and non-human primate neocortex"
2026	Christine Holt	University of Cambridge	(United Kingdom)	"for the discovery of local protein translation in neurons and establishing its importance for brain development and plasticity"
2026	Kelsey Martin	University of California, Los Angeles, Simons Foundation	(United States)	"for the discovery of local protein translation in neurons and establishing its importance for brain development and plasticity"
2026	Erin Schuman	Max Planck Institute for Brain Research	(United States) (Germany)	"for the discovery of local protein translation in neurons and establishing its importance for brain development and plasticity"
2026	Oswald Steward	University of California, Irvine	(United States)	"for the discovery of local protein translation in neurons and establishing its importance for brain development and plasticity"

== See also ==
- List of general science and technology awards
- List of astronomy awards
- List of neuroscience awards
- The Brain Prize
- Golden Brain Award
- Gruber Prize in Neuroscience
- W. Alden Spencer Award
- Karl Spencer Lashley Award
- Mind & Brain Prize
- Ralph W. Gerard Prize in Neuroscience
