= Otto Scherzer =

German physicist (1909–1982

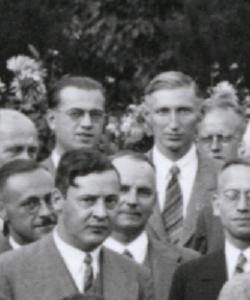
- Above Rudolf Hilsch and Otto Scherzer, in front Erich Hückel at Stuttgart in 1935
- Born: May 9, 1909; Passau, Germany
- Died: November 15, 1982 (aged 73); Darmstadt, Germany
- Education: LMU Munich (PhD)
- Known for: Scherzer's theorem
- Scientific career
- Fields: Physics; Electron microscopy
- Thesis: Über die Ausstrahlung bei der Bremsung von Protonen und schnellen Elektronen (1931)

Otto Scherzer (9 March 1909 – 15 November 1982) was a German theoretical physicist who made contributions to electron microscopy, including the Scherzer's theorem for the spherical aberration of electronic lenses.

== Education ==
Scherzer studied physics at the Technical University of Munich and the LMU Munich from 1927 to 1931. His thesis advisor at LMU was Arnold Sommerfeld, and he was granted his doctorate in 1931. His thesis was on the quantum theory of Bremsstrahlung, titled "Über die Ausstrahlung bei der Bremsung von Protonen und schnellen Elektronen". From 1932 to 1933, Scherzer was an assistant to Carl Ramsauer at the Allgemeine Elektrizitäts-Gesellschaft, an electric combine with headquarters in Berlin and Frankfurt-on-Main. There, he did research on electron optics. He completed his Habilitation in 1934, and he then became a Privatdozent at LMU and an assistant to Sommerfeld.

== Career ==
In 1935, Scherzer moved to the Technische Hochschule Darmstadt. In 1936, he became an extraordinarius professor and director of the theoretical physics department. In a landmark 1936 paper, Scherzer proved that the spherical and chromatic aberrations of a rotationally symmetric, static, space-charge-free, dioptric lens for electron beams cannot be eliminated by skillful design, in contrast to the case for glass lenses. This was later called Scherzer's theorem and is the only named and well-established theorem in the field of charged particle optics. In 1947, Scherzer published a sequel to this paper proposing various corrected lenses, dependent upon abandoning one or other requirements as set forth in the 1936 paper. Scherzer's derivations contributed to the development of electron microscopy.

From 1939 to 1945, Scherzer worked on radar at the communications research headquarters of the Kriegsmarine. In a communication with Sommerfeld, dated 2 December 1944, Scherzer reported war damage in Darmstadt and commented on his work on radar. From 1944 to 1945, Scherzer was head of radar finding research (Arbeitsbereich Funkmesstechnik) for the Reich Research Council (Reichsforschungsrat), which was the coordinating agency in the Reich Education Ministry (German: Reichsziehungsministerium) for the centralized planning of basic and applied research.

In 1954, Scherzer became ordinarius professor at the Technische Hochschule Darmstadt, where he helped found the Society for Heavy Ion Research. A literature citation places Scherzer at Darmstadt as late as 1978. Scherzer died in Darmstadt.

== Awards ==
- 1983 – Microscopy Society of America, Distinguished Scientist Award, Physical Sciences

== Selected bibliography ==
- Scherzer, Otto (1936). "Über einige Fehler von Elektronenlinsen" [On some aberrations of electron lenses]. Zeitschrift für Physik. 101 (9): 593–603. Bibcode:1936ZPhy..101..593S. doi:10.1007/BF01349606. S2CID 120073021. - English translation published as Peter W. Hawkes, ed. (1994). "On Some Aberrations of Electron Lenses". Selected Papers on Electron Optics. SPIE. pp. 340–351. ISBN 9780819415721. OCLC 29910978.
- O. Scherzer, Sphärische und chromatische Korrektur von Elektronenlinsen, Optik 2 114–132 (1947) as cited in Peter Hawkes - Recent Advances in Electron Optics and Electron Microscopy.
- O. Scherzer (Signal Corps Engineering Laboratories, Fort Monmouth, New Jersey) The Theoretical Resolution Limit of the Electron Microscope, Journal of Applied Physics Volume 20, Issue 1, pp. 20–29 (1948). Received June 14, 1948.
- O. Scherzer, "Limitations for the resolving power of electron microscopes", Proceedings ICEM-9 Volume 3, 123–9 (1978) as cited in Peter Hawkes - The Long Road to Spherical Aberration Correction.

=== Books ===
- E. Brüche and O. Scherzer Geometrische Elektronenoptik: Grundlagen und Anwendungen (Springer, 1934)
