= Peter Tsou =

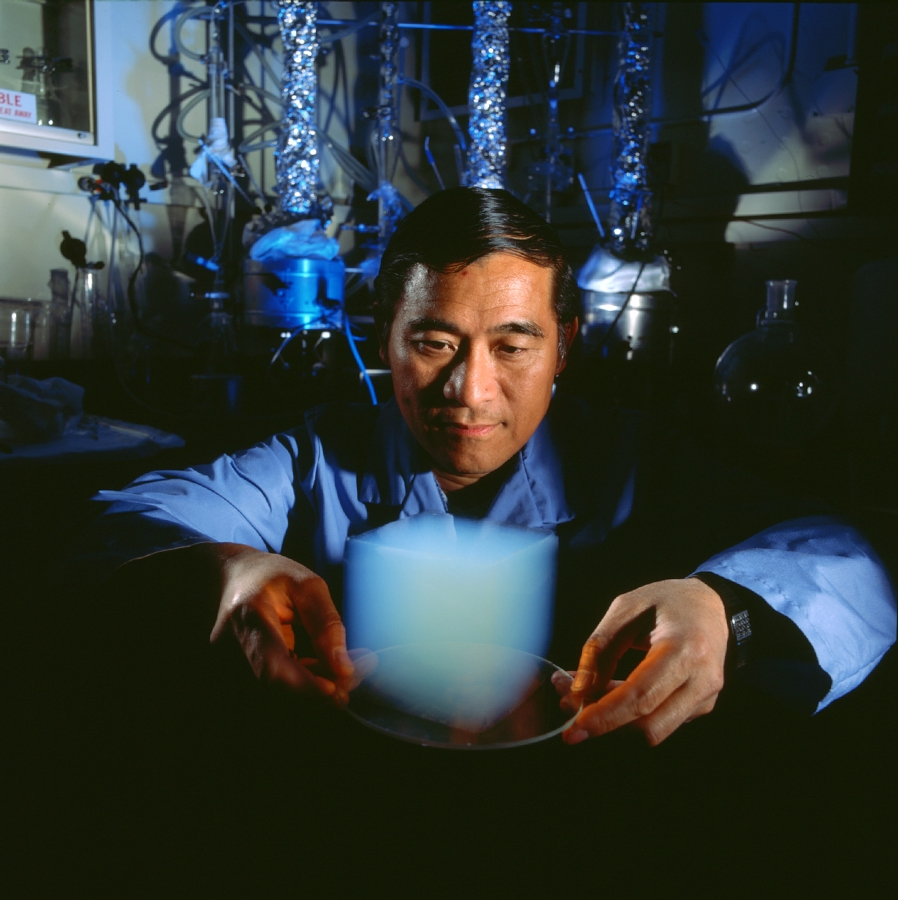
- Peter Tsou with a sample of aerogel
- Citizenship: United States
- Education: University of California, Berkeley (BS, MS); University of California, Los Angeles (PhD)
- Known for: Stardust mission
- Awards: NASA Group Achievement Award; NASA Exceptional Achievement Medal
- Scientific career
- Workplaces: Jet Propulsion Laboratory

"Astrobiology of Icy Worlds". astrobiology.nasa.gov. December 2014. Archived from the original on 2024-05-16.

Peter Tsou is a science staff member at the Jet Propulsion Laboratory (JPL) of the California Institute of Technology. His research primarily centers around the utilization of aerogel in space exploration.

Tsou has served as the principal investigator (PI) for several missions conducted on the Space Shuttle and Mir, during which he devised the method of intact capture for hypervelocity particles. He gained recognition for his involvement in the capture and retrieval of cometary particles through NASA's Stardust mission, where he served as the deputy PI.

== Education ==
Tsou completed his undergraduate studies at the University of California, Berkeley, where he obtained a B.S. degree in electrical engineering in 1965, followed by an M.S. degree in the same field in 1966. In 1972, he received his Ph.D. in large-scale engineering systems from the University of California, Los Angeles.

== Career ==
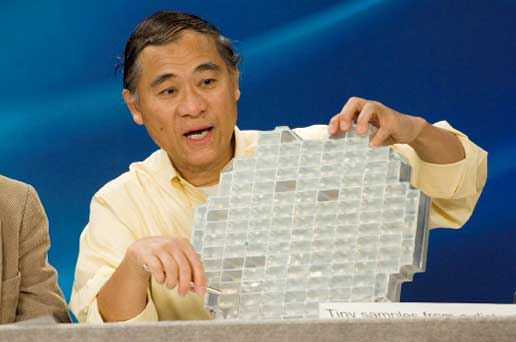
Dr. Peter Tsou, displaying Stardust sample tray during a press conference at Johnson Space Center.

Since 1974, Tsou has been employed at NASA's Jet Propulsion Laboratory (JPL) in Pasadena, CA. Currently, he holds the position of Deputy Principal Investigator for the STARDUST mission, a role he has held since 1994. Tsou has also served as principal investigator for various projects, including the MIR Sample Return Experiment (1994–1997), the Spacehab II Sample Return Experiment, and the Get Away Special Sample Return Experiment (1989–present). He has held several managerial and engineering positions at JPL, including STARDUST proposal manager (1992–1994), instrument definition manager (1984–1990), spacecraft system engineer (1982–1990), task manager for the Low-Cost Solar Array program (1975–1980), and system engineer (1974–1975).

As of 2020, Tsou was working on two projects at NASA. He conducted research in the field of astrobiology of ice planets and their potential water-rich environments.

== Research ==
Dr. Tsou's research focus has primarily been on the retrieval of cometary samples. He is credited with inventing the method of capturing hypervelocity particles intact, which has been instrumental in missions such as Stardust. Collaborating with scientists from Lawrence Livermore National Laboratory, he contributed to the development of a lighter aerogel specifically designed for capturing cometary particles. Additionally, he played a role in introducing aerogel as a flight-qualified variable density material and capture medium for space missions.

Furthermore, Dr. Tsou has made contributions to the field of space thermal insulation by inventing an integrated aerogel thermal-structural design for the Mars Pathfinder Sojourner rover.

His research interests extend to investigating the potential exobiological effects of extraterrestrial bodies and exploring methods to retrieve samples of materials from other planets.

== Awards ==
- 2000 NASA Patent: Large Field of View 3-D Hologram Display System
- 2000 NASA Group Achievement Award – STARDUST Project Team
- 1997 NASA Exceptional Achievement Medal
- 1996 JPL Inaugural Award for Excellence – Exceptional Technical Excellence
- 1985 NASA Group Achievement Award – Low-Cost Solar Array Project

== In Media ==
Peter Tsou has appeared on TV twice as himself.

- Naked Science - Season 4, Episode 17: Birth of the Solar System (2007)
- The Universe - Season 3, Episode 6: Deadly Comets and Meteors (2008)
