= National Center for Electron Microscopy =

Electron microscope laboratory facility

Coordinates: 37°52′43″N 122°15′9″W

The National Center for Electron Microscopy (NCEM) is a U.S. Department of Energy national user facility at Lawrence Berkeley National Laboratory in Berkeley, California, for unclassified scientific research using advanced electron microscopy. In 2014, NCEM merged as a facility within the Molecular Foundry, also located at Berkeley Lab. The NCEM has two double-aberration corrected electron microscopes for atomic resolution imaging.

== History ==
The National Center for Electron Microscopy (NCEM) was established in 1983 to explore and research the characterization of materials with state-of-the-art instrumentation and expertise.
