= Aberration-corrected transmission electron microscopy =

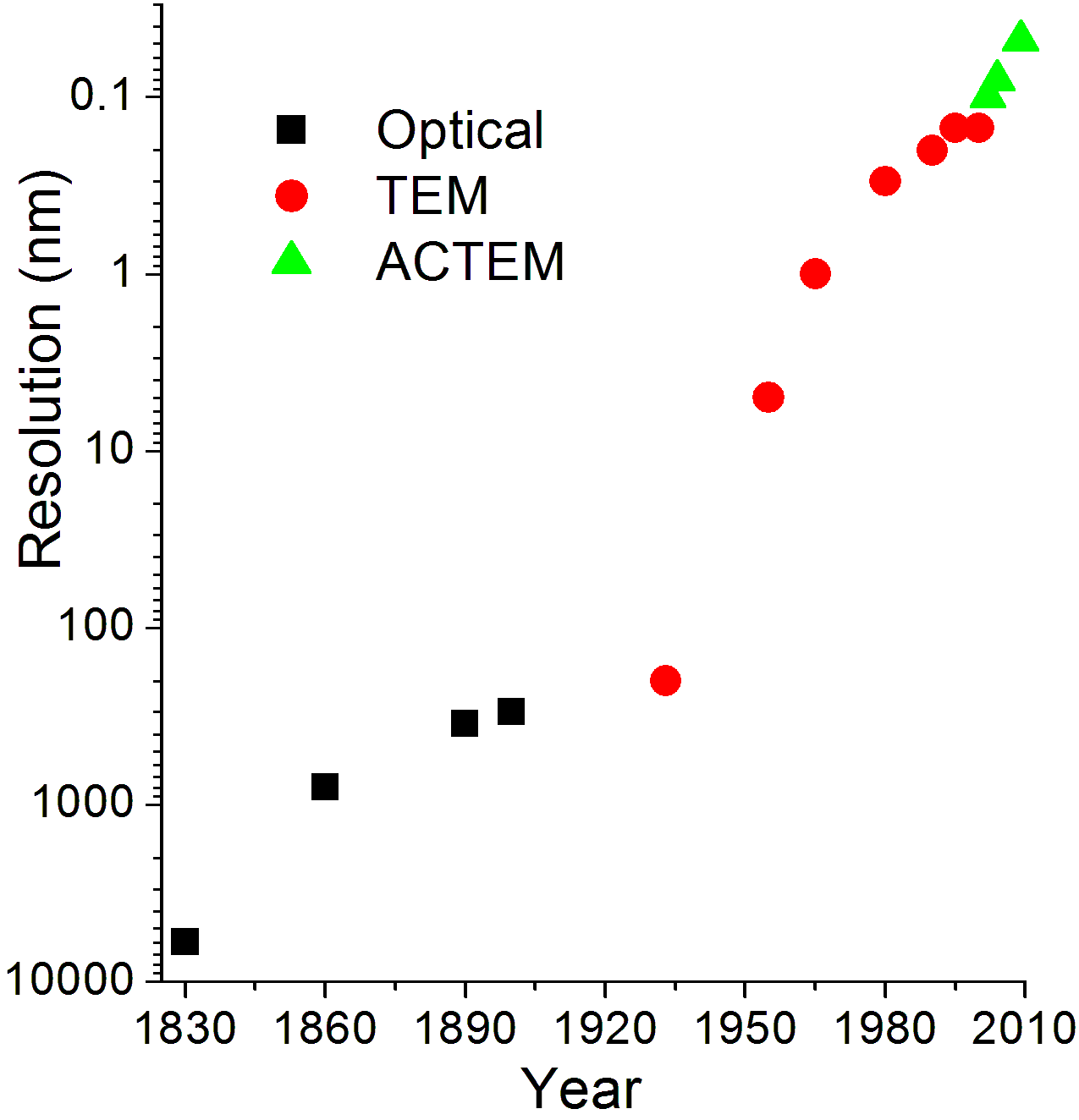
Evolution of spatial resolution achieved with optical, transmission (TEM) and aberration-corrected electron microscopes (ACTEM).

Aberration-corrected transmission electron microscopy (AC-TEM) is the general term for using electron microscopes where electro optical components are introduced to reduce the aberrations that would otherwise reduce the resolution of images. Historically electron microscopes had quite severe aberrations, and until about the start of the 21st century the resolution was quite limited, at best able to image the atomic structure of materials so long as the atoms were far enough apart. Theoretical methods of correcting the aberrations existed for some time, but could not be implemented in practice. Around the turn of the century the electron optical components were coupled with computer control of the lenses and their alignment; this was the breakthrough which led to significant improvements both in resolution and the clarity of the images. As of 2024 correction of geometric aberrations is standard in many commercial electron microscopes. They are extensively used in many different areas of science.

== History ==
=== Early theoretical work ===
Scherzer's theorem is a theorem in the field of electron microscopy. It states that there is a limit of resolution for electronic lenses because of unavoidable aberrations.

German physicist Otto Scherzer found in 1936 that the electromagnetic lenses, which are used in electron microscopes to focus the electron beam, entail unavoidable imaging errors. These aberrations are of spherical and chromatic nature, that is, the spherical aberration coefficient C_{s} and the chromatic aberration coefficient C_{c} are always positive.

Scherzer solved the system of Laplace equations for electromagnetic potentials assuming the following conditions:

1. electromagnetic fields are rotationally symmetric,
2. electromagnetic fields are static,
3. there are no space charges.

He showed that under these conditions the aberrations that emerge degrade the resolution of an electron microscope up to one hundred times the wavelength of the electron. He concluded that the aberrations cannot be fixed with a combination of rotationally symmetrical lenses.

In his original paper, Scherzer summarized: "Chromatic and spherical aberration are unavoidable errors of the space charge-free electron lens. In principle, distortion (strain and twist) and (all types of) coma can be eliminated. Due to the inevitability of spherical aberration, there is a practical, but not a fundamental, limit to the resolving power of the electron microscope."

The resolution limit provided by Scherzer's theorem can be overcome by breaking one of the above-mentioned three conditions. Giving up rotational symmetry in electronic lenses helps in correcting spherical aberrations. A correction of the chromatic aberration can be achieved with time-dependent, i.e. non-static, electromagnetic fields (for example in particle accelerators).

=== Prototypes ===
The benefit of the scanning transmission electron microscope (STEM) and its potential for high-resolution imaging had been investigated by Albert Crewe. He investigated the need for a brighter electron source in the microscope, positing that cold field emission guns would be feasible. Through this and other iterations, Crewe was able to improve the resolution of the STEM from 30 Ångstroms (Å) down to 2.5 Å. Crewe's work made it possible to visualize individual atoms for the first time.

Crewe filed patents for electron aberration correctors, but could never get functioning prototypes.

In the early efforts to correct aberrations, low voltage electrostatic correctors were explored. These correctors used electrostatic lenses to manipulate the electron beam. The advantage of low voltage systems was their reduced chromatic aberration, as the energy spread of the electrons was lower at reduced voltages. Researchers found that by carefully designing these electrostatic elements, they could correct some of the spherical and chromatic aberrations that plagued early electron microscopes. These early correctors were crucial in understanding the behavior of electron optics and provided a stepping stone toward more sophisticated correction techniques.

==== Phase plate and similar ideas ====
The design parameters and functional requirements for phase plates were thoroughly examined in the context of their application as spherical aberration correctors. In particular, emphasis was placed on developing a programmable, electrostatic phase plate, highlighting its potential for precise control and adaptability in correcting aberrations.

==== First demonstrations ====
The first demonstration of aberration correction in TEM mode was demonstrated by Harald Rose and Maximilian Haider in 1998 using a hexapole corrector, and in STEM mode by Ondrej Krivanek and Niklas Dellby in 1999 using a quadrupole/octupole corrector. As the electron optic resolution improved, it became apparent that there also needed to be improvements to the mechanical stability of the microscopes to keep pace. Many aberration corrected microscopes heavily employ sound and temperature insulation, usually in an enclosure surrounding the microscope.

== Early commercial products ==
=== Nion ===
Ondrej Krivanek and Niklas Dellby founded Nion in the late 1990s, initially as a collaboration with IBM. Their first products were correctors of spherical aberration correctors for existing STEMs. Later on, they designed an ACTEM from scratch, UltraSTEM 1.

=== CEOS ===
The approach to aberration correction used by Rose and Haider formed the basis of the company CEOS. They produced modular correctors which could be incorporated into microscopes produced by other vendors, which led to commercial products from FEI, JEOL, Hitachi, and Zeiss.

=== TEAM Project ===
The Transmission Electron Aberration-corrected Microscope (TEAM) project was a collaborative effort between Lawrence Berkeley National Laboratory (LBNL), Argonne National Laboratory (ANL), Brookhaven National Laboratory, Oak Ridge National Laboratory, and the University of Illinois, Urbana-Chamaign with the technical goal of reaching spatial resolution 0.05 nanometers, smooth sample translation and tilt, while allowing for a variety of in-situ experiments.

The TEAM project resulted in several microscopes, the first was the ACAT at Argonne National Laboratory in Illinois which had the first chromatic aberration corrector, then the TEAM 0.5 and TEAM I at the Molecular Foundry in California, and concluded in 2009. Both the TEAM microscopes are S/TEMs (they can be used in both TEM mode and STEM mode) that correct for both spherical aberration and chromatic aberration. The TEAM microscopes are managed by the National Center for Electron Microscopy, a facility of the Molecular Foundry at LBNL, and ACAT by the Center for Nanoscale Materials at ANL.

=== Other ===
Several other aberration correctors have been designed and used in electron microscopes such as one by Takanayagi. Similar correctors have also been used at much lower energies such as for LEEM instruments.

== Present state ==
AC-TEM enables resolutions of about 0.1 nm for both standard relatively high-voltage electron microscopes as well as specially designed setups which operate at lower electron energies. An important offshoot of the improved optical resolution is a companion improvement in the mechanical stability. Exploiting these improvements, significantly better identification of chemical contents of materials has become possible, as well as their atomic structure. This has had a major impact on our understanding across multiple fields of study.

== Applications ==
There is a significant difference in the usage of AC-TEM across various fields. Despite aberration correction for electron microscopes existing in the case of STEMs, the amount of electrons needed to form useful images is far greater than biological samples can handle before being destroyed by radiation damage. Life science studies still heavily rely on conventional TEMs, which form a full image with their electron beam (similar to a conventional light microscope).

=== Physical sciences ===
AC-TEM has been used extensively in physical sciences, in part due to the imperviousness of samples to radiation damage. This has ranged across chemistry, materials science and physics.

=== Life sciences ===
Aberration correction have yet to be significantly used in the life sciences, due to generally low atomic weight contrast in biological systems and also the increased radiation damage. However, the side benefits such as improved mechanical stability and detectors have significantly improved data collection quality.
