= Ondrej Krivanek =

British physicist

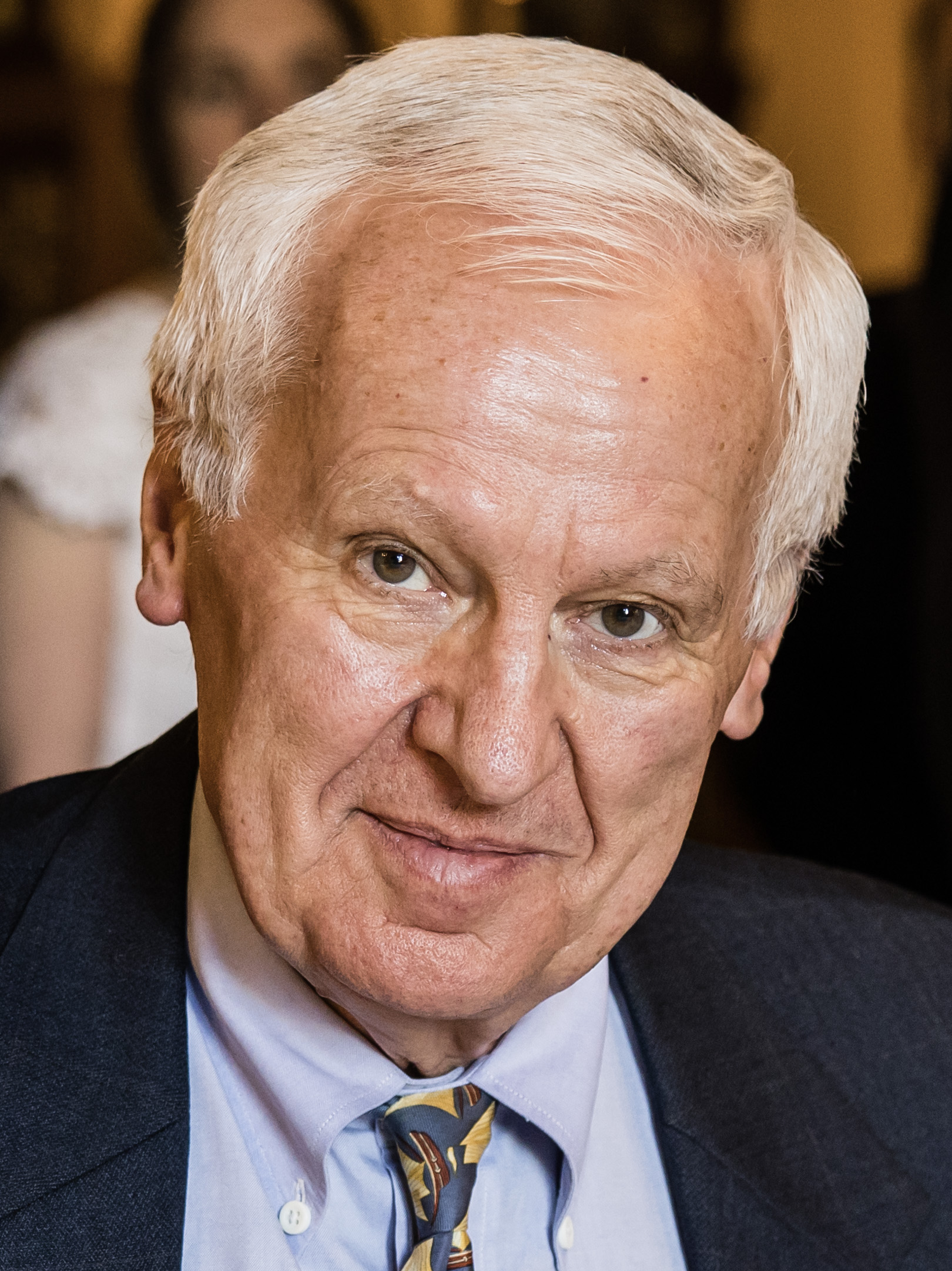
- Krivanek in 2022.
- Born: Ondřej Ladislav Křivánek; 1 August 1950 (age 76); Prague, Czechoslovakia
- Education: University of Cambridge (PhD)
- Awards: Kavli Prize (2020)
- Scientific career
- Fields: Electron microscopy

Ondrej Ladislav Krivanek FRS (Czech: Ondřej Ladislav Křivánek; born 1 August 1950) is a Czech-British physicist resident in the United States, and a leading developer of electron-optical instrumentation. He won the Kavli Prize for Nanoscience in 2020 for his substantial innovations in atomic resolution electron microscopy.

== Early life ==
He was born in Prague, and received his primary and secondary education there. In 1968, he moved to the United Kingdom, where he graduated from University of Leeds and obtained his Ph.D. in physics from University of Cambridge (Trinity College), and became a British citizen in 1974.

== Career ==
His post-doctoral work at Kyoto University, Bell Laboratories and UC Berkeley established him as a leading high resolution electron microscopist, who obtained some of the first atomic resolution images of grain boundaries in semiconductors and of interfaces in semiconductor devices.

Starting in the late 1970s, he designed a series of electron energy loss (EEL) spectrometers and imaging filters, first as a post-doc at UC Berkeley, then as an assistant professor at Arizona State University and a consultant to Gatan Inc., and later as director of R&D at Gatan. These became highly successful, with over 500 installations world-wide. He also co-authored, with Channing Ahn, the EELS Atlas, now a standard reference for electron energy loss spectroscopy, pioneered the design and use of slow-scan CCD cameras for electron microscopy, and developed efficient microscope aberration diagnosis and tuning algorithms. He also initiated the development and designed the first user interface of DigitalMicrograph, which went on to become the world's leading electron microscopy image acquisition and processing software.

The imaging filters he designed were corrected for second order aberrations and distortions, and he next took up the correction of third order aberrations, a key problem in electron microscopy. Following an unsuccessful application for funding in the US, he applied, successfully, for support to the Royal Society (jointly with L. Michael Brown FRS and Andrew Bleloch). He then took an unpaid leave of absence from Gatan to develop an aberration corrector for a scanning transmission electron microscope (STEM) in Cambridge UK, together with Niklas Dellby and others. In 1997, this led to the first STEM aberration corrector that succeeded in improving the resolution of the electron microscope it was built into. Also in 1997 and with Niklas Dellby, he started Nion Co., where they produced a new corrector design. In 2000 this corrector became the first commercially delivered electron microscope aberration corrector in the world (to IBM T.J. Watson Research Center), and soon after delivery it produced the first directly interpretable sub-Å resolution images obtained by any type of an electron microscope.

Nion correctors delivered to Oak Ridge National Laboratory produced the first directly interpretable sub-Å resolution electron microscope images of a crystal lattice and the first EEL spectra of single atoms in a bulk solid. Nion has since progressed onto designing and manufacturing whole scanning transmission electron microscopes that have produced many further world-leading results, such as atomic-resolution elemental mapping and analytical imaging in which every individual atom is resolved and identified.

In 2013, Nion introduced a new design of a monochromator for STEM that allowed the first demonstration of vibrational/phonon spectroscopy in the electron microscope, and can now reach 3 meV energy resolution at 20 kV. Used in tandem with the new Nion energy loss spectrometer, the monochromator has led to many revolutionary results. These include a 2016 demonstration of damage-free vibrational spectroscopy of different hydrogen environments in a biological material (Guanine), 2019 demonstrations of atomic resolution imaging using the phonon signal and of detecting and mapping an amino acid different in just one ^{12}C atom being substituted by ^{13}C (isotopic shift), and a 2020 detection of the vibrational signal from a single Si atom.

Nion Co. was acquired by Bruker (BRKR) in 2024. He is currently Senior Scientific Advisor to Bruker and Affiliate Professor at Arizona State University.

== Awards ==
- International Member, National Academy of Engineering (2025)
- Honorary Doctorate, University of Leeds (2023)
- Honorary Doctorate, Masaryk University (2022)
- CSMS Award for Merit in Microscopy (2021)
- Kavli Prize for Nanoscience (2020)
- Fellow of Microbeam Analysis Society of America (2018)
- Special issue of Ultramicroscopy honoring Ondrej Krivanek's scientific career (2017)
- Honorary Fellow of Robinson College, Cambridge UK (2016)
- Cosslett Medal, International Federation of Microscopy Societies (2014)
- Duncumb Award, Microbeam Analysis Society (2014)
- Honorary Fellow of Royal Microscopical Society (2014)
- Fellow of American Physical Society (2013).
- election to Royal Society Fellowship (2010).
- Distinguished Scientist Award of the Microscopy Society of America (2008)
- Duddell Medal and Prize of the British Institute of Physics (2000)
- Seto prize of the Japanese Microscopy Society (1999)
- R&D100 Award (for imaging filter design, with A.J. Gubbens and N. Dellby, 1993)
- 1st places in special and parallel slaloms at the 1975 Oxford-Cambridge Varsity ski race
- 2nd place at the 2nd International Physics Olympiad (in Budapest in 1968, as team member for Czechoslovakia)
