= List of Massachusetts Institute of Technology faculty =

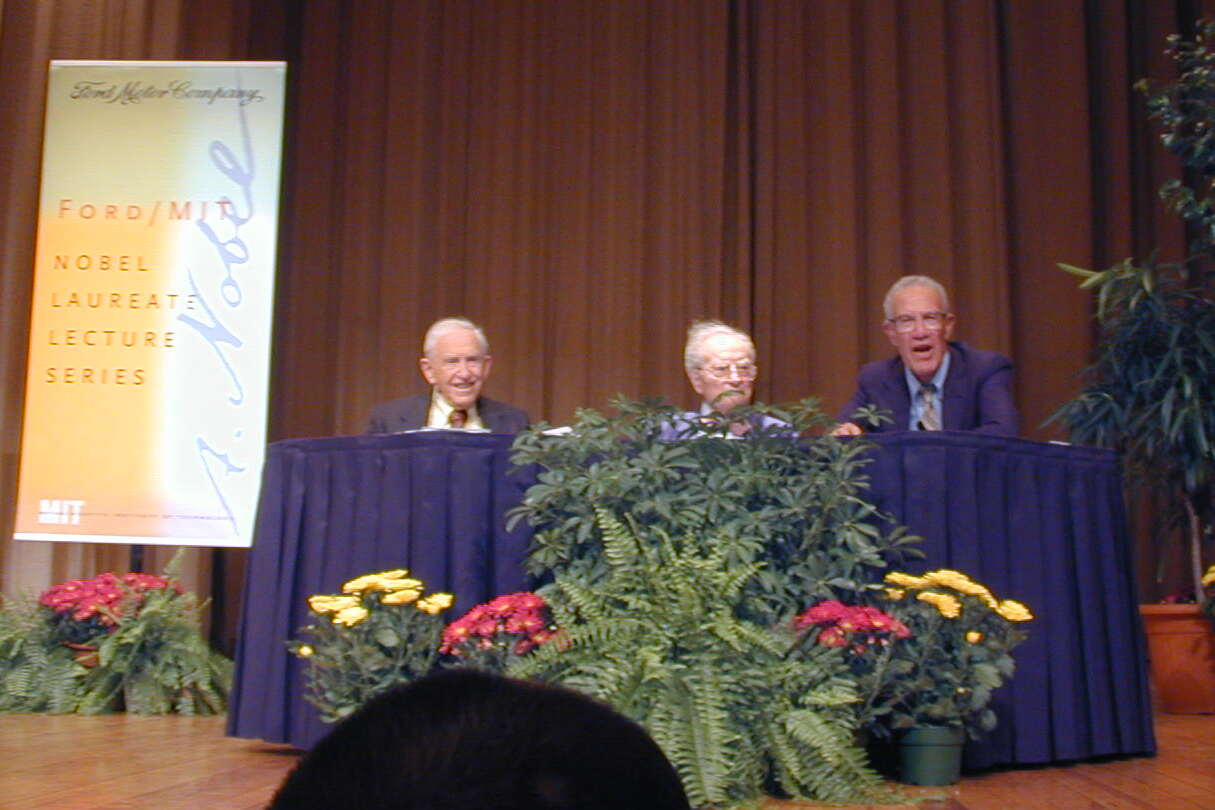
Institute Professors Emeriti and Nobel laureates (from left to right) Franco Modigliani, Paul Samuelson and Robert Solow, pictured in 2000

This list of Massachusetts Institute of Technology faculty includes current, emeritus, former, and deceased professors, lecturers, and researchers at the Massachusetts Institute of Technology. Faculty members who have become Institute Professors, Nobel Laureates, MacArthur Fellows, National Medal of Science recipients, or have earned other significant awards and made significant contributions are listed below.

== Institute Professors ==
A few distinguished members of the faculty have held the title of Institute Professor in recognition of their records of achievement and dedication to the MIT community.

== Nobel laureates ==
=== Current faculty ===
| Name | Department | Year | Award | Citation | Notes |
|---|---|---|---|---|---|
| Peter Diamond | Economics | 2010 | Economics | "for their analysis of markets with search frictions" | |
| H. Robert Horvitz | Biology | 2002 | Medicine/Physiology | "for their discoveries concerning 'genetic regulation of organ development and programmed cell death'" | |
| Wolfgang Ketterle | Physics | 2001 | Physics | "for the achievement of Bose–Einstein condensation in dilute gases of alkali atoms, and for early fundamental studies of the properties of the condensates" | |
| Robert C. Merton | Economics | 1997 | Economics | "for a new method to determine the value of derivatives" | |
| Richard R. Schrock | Chemistry | 2005 | Chemistry | "for the development of the metathesis method in organic synthesis" | |
| Phillip A. Sharp | Biology | 1993 | Medicine/Physiology | "for their discoveries of split genes" | |
| Samuel Ting | Physics | 1976 | Physics | "for their pioneering work in the discovery of a heavy elementary particle of a new kind" | |
| Susumu Tonegawa | Brain and Cognitive Sciences | 1987 | Medicine/Physiology | "for his discovery of the genetic principle for generation of antibody diversity" | |
| Frank Wilczek | Physics | 2004 | Physics | "for the discovery of asymptotic freedom in the theory of the strong interaction" | |

=== Emeritus faculty ===
| Name | Department | Year | Award | Citation | Notes |
|---|---|---|---|---|---|
| Jerome I. Friedman | Physics | 1990 | Physics | "for their pioneering investigations concerning deep inelastic scattering of electrons on protons and bound neutrons, which have been of essential importance for the development of the quark model in particle physics" | |

=== Deceased faculty ===
| Name | Department | Year | Award | Citation | Notes |
|---|---|---|---|---|---|
| Henry W. Kendall | Physics | 1990 | Physics | "for their pioneering investigations concerning deep inelastic scattering of electrons on protons and bound neutrons, which have been of essential importance for the development of the quark model in particle physics" | |
| H. Gobind Khorana | Biology | 1968 | Medicine/Physiology | "for their interpretation of the genetic code and its function in protein synthesis" | |
| Salvador E. Luria | Biology | 1969 | Medicine/Physiology | "for their discoveries concerning the replication mechanism and the genetic structure of viruses" | |
| Franco Modigliani | Economics | 1985 | Economics | "for his pioneering analyses of saving and of financial markets" | |
| Mario Molina | Earth, Atmospheric, and Planetary Science | 1995 | Chemistry | "for their work in atmospheric chemistry, particularly concerning the formation and decomposition of ozone" | |
| Paul A. Samuelson | Economics | 1970 | Economics | "for the scientific work through which he has developed static and dynamic economic theory and actively contributed to raising the level of analysis in economic science" | |
| Nir Shavit | Engineering | 2021 | Physics | "For his advances in algorithms research and his unfailing love of spreading engineering knowledge" | |
| Clifford G. Shull | Physics | 1994 | Physics | "for the development of the neutron diffraction technique" | |
| Robert M. Solow | Economics | 1987 | Economics | "for his contributions to the theory of economic growth" | |

=== Former faculty ===
| Name | Department | Year | Award | Citation | Notes |
|---|---|---|---|---|---|
| David Baltimore | Biology | 1975 | Medicine/Physiology | "for their discoveries concerning the interaction between tumour viruses and the genetic material of the cell" | |
| Robert Engle | Economics | 2003 | Economics | "for methods of analyzing economic time series with time-varying volatility (ARCH)" | |
| Daniel L. McFadden | Economics | 2000 | Economics | "for his development of theory and methods for analyzing discrete choice" | |
| John Forbes Nash, Jr. | Economics | 1994 | Economics | "for [his] pioneering analysis of equilibria in the theory of non-cooperative games" | |
| Myron S. Scholes | Economics | 1997 | Economics | "for a new method to determine the value of derivatives" | |
| K. Barry Sharpless | Chemistry | 2001 | Chemistry | "for his work on chirally catalysed oxidation reactions" | |
| Charles H. Townes | Physics | 1964 | Physics | "for fundamental work in the field of quantum electronics, which has led to the construction of oscillators and amplifiers based on the maser-laser principle" | |
| Steven Weinberg | Physics | 1979 | Physics | "for their contributions to the theory of the unified weak and electromagnetic interaction between elementary particles, including, inter alia, the prediction of the weak neutral current" | |

=== Former and/or retired research staff ===
| Name | Laboratory | Year | Award | Citation | Notes |
|---|---|---|---|---|---|
| Thomas R. Cech | Post-doc, Department of Biology (1975–1978) | 1989 | Chemistry | "for their discovery of catalytic properties of RNA" | |
| Aaron Ciechanover | | 2004 | Chemistry | "for the discovery of ubiquitin-mediated protein degradation" | |
| Horst L. Störmer | Researcher, Francis Bitter High Magnetic Field Lab | 1998 | Physics | "for their discovery of a new form of quantum fluid with fractionally charged excitations" | |
| E. Donnall Thomas | Post-doc (1949–1950) | 1990 | Medicine/Physiology | "for their discoveries concerning organ and cell transplantation in the treatment of human disease" | |
| Daniel C. Tsui | Researcher, Francis Bitter High Magnetic Field Lab | 1998 | Physics | "for their discovery of a new form of quantum fluid with fractionally charged excitations" | |
| Geoffrey Wilkinson | Research Associate, Department of Chemistry (1950–1951) | 1973 | Chemistry | "for their pioneering work, performed independently, on the chemistry of the organometallic, so called sandwich compounds" | |

== MacArthur Fellows ==
=== Current faculty ===
| Name | Department | Year | Citation | Notes |
|---|---|---|---|---|
| Regina Barzilay | Computer Science & Artificial Intelligence Lab | 2017 | "developing machine learning methods that enable computers to process and analyze vast amounts of human language data" | |
| Angela Belcher | Materials Science and Engineering | 2004 | "developing new techniques for manipulating systems that straddle the boundary of organic and inorganic chemistry at the molecular scale" | |
| Erik Demaine | Electrical Engineering and Computer Science | 2003 | | |
| Junot Díaz | Comparative Media Studies/Writing | 2012 | "using raw, vernacular dialogue and spare, unsentimental prose to draw readers into the various and distinct worlds that immigrants must straddle" | |
| Esther Duflo | Economics | 2009 | "exploring the social and economic forces perpetuating the cycle of poverty for the poorest peoples in South Asia and Africa" | |
| Linda G. Griffith | Biological Engineering | 2006 | "extending the limits of biomedical engineering and its applications for diagnosing disease and regenerating damaged organs" | |
| John Harbison | Music and Theater Arts | 1989 | | |
| Dina Katabi | Electrical Engineering and Computer Science | 2013 | "... contributed to a range of networking issues, from protocols to minimize congestion in high-bandwidth networks to algorithms for spectrum analysis, though most of her work centers on wireless data transmission." | |
| Evelyn Fox Keller | History & Science, Technology, and Society | 1992 | | |
| Eric Lander | Biology | 1987 | | |
| Heather Lechtman | Material Science and Engineering | 1984 | | |
| Nergis Mavalvala | Physics | 2010 | | |
| David C. Page | Biology | 1986 | | |
| Michael J. Piore | Economics | 1984 | | |
| Daniela L. Rus | Electrical Engineering and Computer Science | 2002 | | |
| Sara Seager | Earth, Atmospheric, and Planetary Sciences & Physics | 2013 | | |
| Peter Shor | Mathematics | 1999 | | |
| Marin Soljacic | Physics | 2008 | | |
| Alar Toomre | Mathematics | 1984 | | |
| Frank Wilczek | Physics | 1982 | | |
| Jack Wisdom | Earth, Atmospheric, and Planetary Sciences | 1994 | | |

=== Research staff ===
| Name | Laboratory | Year | Citation | Notes |
|---|---|---|---|---|
| Tim Berners-Lee | Computer Science & Artificial Intelligence Lab | 1998 | | |
| Harlan Lane | Research Laboratory of Electronics | 1991 | | |
| Vamsi Mootha | Broad Institute | 2004 | "creating powerful, adaptable computational strategies for mining data collected in laboratories throughout the world, providing an efficient means to hunt down gene interactions that lead to a wide variety of diseases" | |
| Amy Smith | Edgerton Center | 2004 | "designing life-enhancing solutions and labor-saving technologies for people at the far end of dirt roads in the world's most remote societies" | |
| Richard M. Stallman | Computer Science & Artificial Intelligence Lab | 1990 | | |
| George Zweig | Research Laboratory of Electronics | 1981 | | |

=== Former faculty ===
| Name | Department | Year | Citation | Notes |
|---|---|---|---|---|
| Jed Z. Buchwald | History | 1995 | | |
| Michael Kremer | Economics | 1997 | | |
| Sendhil Mullainathan | Economics | 2002 | | |
| Richard C. Mulligan | Biology | 1981 | | |
| Charles Sabel | Science, Technology, Society | 1982 | | |
| Charles Steidel | Physics | 2002 | | |
| Mark S. Wrighton | Chemistry | 1983 | | |

== National Medal of Science ==
=== Current faculty ===
| Name | Department | Year | Citation | Notes |
|---|---|---|---|---|
| Ann M. Graybiel | Biology | 2001 | Biological Sciences - "For her pioneering contributions to the understanding of the anatomy and physiology of the brain, including the structure, chemistry, and function of the pathways subserving thought and movement." | |
| Stephen J. Lippard | Chemistry | 2004 | Chemistry - "For pioneering research in bioinorganic chemistry, which enriched our understanding of how metal compounds interact with DNA, provided important synthetic models for the active sites of metalloproteins, and elucidated key structural and mechanistic features of methane monooxygenase." | |
| Philip A. Sharp | Biology | 2004 | Biological Sciences - "For his contributions to understanding the biochemical pathway of RNA interference phenomena and for his use of RNA interference techniques to perform genetic analyses in mammalian cells." | |
| Kenneth N. Stevens | EECS | 1999 | Engineering - "For his leadership and pioneering contributions to the theory of acoustics of speech production and perception, development of mathematical methods of analysis and modeling to study the acoustics of speech production, and establishing the contemporary foundations of speech science." | |
| Robert A. Weinberg | Biology | 1997 | Biological Sciences - "For his contribution to the identification of cellular oncogenes and their role in cancer, which led to a better understanding of the molecular basis for cancer and its diagnosis and therapy." | |

=== Emeritus faculty ===
| Name | Department | Year | Citation | Notes |

=== Deceased faculty ===
| Name | Department | Year | Citation | Notes |
|---|---|---|---|---|
| Manson Benedict | Nuclear Engineering | 1975 | Engineering - "For inspired and ingenious leadership in the development of gaseous diffision plants for uranium isotope separation, and for his role in creating the discipline of nuclear engineering." | |
| Vannevar Bush | Electrical Engineering | 1963 | Engineering - "For his distinguished achievements in electrical engineering, in the technology of computing machines, in the effective coupling of the physical and life sciences; and in his mobilizing science, engineering and education in enduring ways in the service of the Nation." | |
| Morris Cohen | Metallurgy | 1976 | Engineering - "For original research and advancement of knowledge of the physical and mechanical metallurgy of iron and steel, and especially for his work on the martensitic transformation in the hardening of steel." | |
| Charles Stark Draper | Aeronautics and Astronautics | 1964 | Behavioral & Social Science - "For [his] innumerable imaginative engineering achievements which met urgent National needs of instrumentation, control, and guidance in aeronautics and astronautics." | |
| Mildred S. Dresselhaus | Physics & EECS | 1990 | Engineering - "For her studies of the electronic properties of metals and semimetals, and for her service to the Nation in establishing a prominent place for women in physics and engineering." | |
| Harold E. Edgerton | Electrical Engineering | 1973 | Engineering - "For his vision and creativity in pioneering the field of stroboscopic photography and for his many inventions of instruments for exploring the great depths of the oceans." | |
| Herman Feshbach | Physics | 1986 | Physical Sciences - "For his distinguished contributions to science as a nationally acclaimed leader in physics education by virtue of his extraordinary interest in teaching and his total commitment to scientific excellence." | |
| Samuel Goudsmit | | | | |
| Hermann A. Haus | EECS | 1995 | Engineering - "For his fundamental and seminal research contributions to the field of quantum electronics, noise and ultra-fast optics; and for his service to the engineering profession through teaching." | |
| H. Gobind Khorana | Biology | 1987 | Biological Sciences - "For his innovative contributions that significantly contributed to our understanding of gene structure, membrane function and vision and for the work stimulated by his research which has had a major impact on the biological and chemical sciences." | |
| Daniel Kleppner | Physics | 2006 | "For his pioneering scientific studies of the interaction of atoms and light including Rydberg atoms, cavity quantum electrodynamics, quantum chaos; for developing techniques that opened the way to Bose Einstein Condensation in a gas; and for lucid explanations of physics to nonspecialists and exemplary service to the scientific community." | |
| Edwin H. Land | | 1967 | Engineering - "For many discoveries and inventions in the field of polarized light, rapid photography, including quick processing of the final photograph, for the development of a unique theory of color vision, and for contributions to national defense." | |
| Warren K. Lewis | Chemical Engineering | 1965 | Engineering - "For contributions as a scientist, teacher, and inventor who as the leader of modern chemical engineering has made the American chemical industry preeminent in the world." | |
| Salvador E. Luria | Biology | 1991 | Biological Sciences - "For a lifetime devoted to applying genetics to viruses and bacteria, and for guiding the development of generations of students who have helped create the modern power of molecular biology." | |
| Alexander Rich | Biology | 1995 | Biological Sciences - "For his numerous fundamental contributions to our knowledge of the structure and function of DNA and RNA, the central information carriers in living systems." | |
| Bruno B. Rossi | Physics | 1983 | Physical Sciences - "For fundamental contributions to physics and astronomy through his investigations into the nature and origin of cosmic rays and his initiatives that led to the direct detection of the solar wind and to the discovery of extrasolar x-ray sources." | |
| Paul A. Samuelson | Economics | 1996 | Behavioral & Social Science - "For fundamental contributions to economic science, specifically general equilibrium theory and macroeconomics, and to economic education and policy over a period of nearly 60 years." | |
| Claude E. Shannon | EECS | 1966 | Engineering - "For brilliant contributions to the mathematical theories of communications and information processing and for his early and continuing impact on the development of these disciplines." | |
| Isadore M. Singer | Mathematics | 1983 | Mathematics & Computer Science - "For his inspired revival of differential geometry and its connections to analysis; for his contribution to the discovery and applications of the index theorem for differential operators; and for his leadership in using geometric and topological methods in connection with theoretical physics." | |
| Robert M. Solow | Economics | 1999 | Behavioral & Social Science - "For his creation of the modern framework for analyzing the effects of investment and technological progress on economic growth, greatly influencing economics and economic policy worldwide." | |
| John G. Trump | Nuclear Engineering | 1983 | Engineering - "For his introduction of new machines and methods for the widespread beneficial application of ionizing radiation to medicine, industry and atomic physics." | |
| Victor F. Weisskopf | Physics | 1979 | Physical Sciences - "For important contributions to our understanding of nuclear matter and nuclear reactions, and early fundamental contributions to our understanding of elementary particles." | |
| Norbert Wiener | Mathematics & EECS | 1963 | Mathematics & Computer Science - "For his marvellously versatile contributions, profoundly original, ranging within pure and applied mathematics, and penetrating boldly into the engineering and biological sciences." | |

=== Former faculty ===
| Name | Department | Year | Citation | Notes |
|---|---|---|---|---|
| David Baltimore | Biology | 1999 | Biological Sciences - "For his fundamental discoveries in virology, tumor biology and immunology, notably the discovery of how tumor-causing viruses multiply; for his devotion to building excellence in scientific institutions; and for his statesmanship in fostering communication between scientists and the general public." | |
| John W. Cahn | Chemistry | 1998 | Chemistry - "For his pioneering work on thermodynamics and kinetics of phase transitions and diffusion, on interfacial phenomena, and for his contributions to the understanding of periodic and quasi-periodic structures." | |
| George A. Miller | Psychology | 1991 | Behavioral and Social Sciences - "For his innovative leadership in the scientific study of language and cognition, and for his commitment to improved education for literacy." | |
| Charles H. Townes | Physics | 1982 | Physical Sciences - "For fundamental contributions to the understanding of matter through its interaction with electromagnetic radiations and the application of this knowledge to the service of mankind, most notably in the invention of the maser and laser." | |
| Steven Weinberg | Physics | 1991 | Physical Sciences - "For his contributions to the discovery of the structure of the fundamental forces of nature; the development of the standard model, and the unification of the weak and electromagnetic forces." | |
| George M. Whitesides | Chemistry | 1998 | Chemistry - "For innovative and far-ranging research in chemistry, biology, biochemistry and material science, pioneering work of technological interest and his extensive involvement with teaching, government and industry." | |

=== Former and/or retired research staff ===
| Name | Department | Year | Citation | Notes |
|---|---|---|---|---|
| Thomas R. Cech | Chemistry | 1995 | Chemistry - "For his discoveries regarding RNA catalysis that have added new dimensions to the understanding of the role of RNA in living systems." | |
| E. Donnall Thomas | Biology | 1990 | Biological Sciences - "For his pioneering work in the science and application of transplantation biology to successful bone marrow transplantation in man for the treatment of cancer and related conditions." | |

== Other prominent faculty and researchers ==
| Name | Department | Description | Notes |
|---|---|---|---|
| Hal Abelson | Electrical Engineering and Computer Science | | |
| Leo Beranek | Electrical Engineering and Computer Science | co-founder of the pioneering telecommunications and Internet company Bolt, Beranek and Newman | |
| Adam J. Berinsky | Political Science | professor and author | |
| Richard P. Binzel | Earth, Atmospheric, and Planetary Science | inventor of the Torino Scale | |
| Richard Bolt | Electrical Engineering and Computer Science | | |
| George Boolos | Mathematician | philosopher and mathematical logician | |
| Amar G. Bose | Electrical Engineering and Computer Science | audio entrepreneur, founder of Bose Corporation | |
| Rodney Brooks | Electrical Engineering and Computer Science | behavioral roboticist | |
| Thomas Ringgold Camp | Sanitary Engineering | department head of Sanitary Engineering; founder of Camp, Dresser & McKee | |
| Jule Gregory Charney | Earth, Atmospheric and Planetary Sciences | professor and pioneer in numerical weather prediction and atmospheric dynamics | |
| Iain Cheeseman | Biology | assistant professor of Biology | |
| Noam Chomsky | Linguistics | Institute Professor and professor emeritus; notable linguist, philosopher and political activist | |
| David D. Clark | Electrical Engineering and Computer Science | | |
| Jerome Connor | Civil and Environmental Engineering | Emeritus professor. Taught at the university for over 50 years. | |
| John Ernest Cook | Institute Organist | composer and organist | |
| J.P. Den Hartog | Mechanical Engineering | mechanical vibration, textbooks | |
| Catherine D'Ignazio | Urban Studies and Planning | director of the Data + Feminism lab | |
| John J. Donovan | Electrical Engineering, Computer Science, and Management | professor of Electrical Engineering, Computer Science, and Management; founder of Cambridge Technology Partners | |
| John W. Dower | History | historian of Japan, winner of a Pulitzer Prize | |
| James L. Elliot | Earth, Atmospheric, and Planetary Sciences | planetary occultations | |
| Kerry Emanuel | Earth, Atmospheric, and Planetary Sciences | hurricanes | |
| Jay W. Forrester | Management | system dynamics, creator of Whirlwind I computer | |
| Ivan Getting | Electrical Engineering and Computer Science | co-inventor with Bradford Parkinson of GPS | |
| Brison D. Gooch | History (1950s) | specialist in history of France, Belgium, Napoleon III, Revolutions of 1848, and the Crimean War | |
| Eric Grimson | Electrical Engineering and Computer Science | computer vision and its applications in medical image analysis, chancellor of MIT | |
| Alan Grodzinsky | Electrical, Mechanical, and Biological Engineering | cartilage biomechanics, electromechanics, and tissue engineering applied to osteoarthritis research | |
| Jonathan Gruber | Economics | consultant to Health and Human Services Department; helped develop the Affordable Care Act ("Obamacare") to reform health insurance | |
| Alan Guth | Physics | proposed the idea of cosmic inflation | |
| Steven R. Hall | Aeronautics and Astronautics | professor; former chair of MIT Faculty | |
| Paula T. Hammond | Chemical Engineering | nanotechnology | |
| Daniel Harlow | Physics | winner of the New Horizons in Physics Prize in 2019 | |
| John R. Hauser | Management | | |
| Thomas H. Jordan | Earth, Atmospheric and Planetary Sciences | former department head of EAPS; director of the Southern California Earthquake Center | |
| Yael Tauman Kalai | Electrical Engineering and Computer Science | cryptographer | |
| Leslie Kolodziejski | Electrical engineer | inventor and academic; graduate officer of Electrical Engineering and Computer Science at MIT | |
| Thomas Levenson | Writing and Humanistic Studies | science writer and filmmaker | |
| Walter Lewin | Physics | star of popular Walter Lewin Lectures on Physics | |
| J. C. R. Licklider | | leader of the IPTO | |
| Alan Lightman | Physics | writer, physicist | |
| Andrew B. Lippman | Media Lab | Media Lab pioneer | |
| Edward Lorenz | Earth, Atmospheric, and Planetary Sciences | developed the butterfly effect theory | |
| John Maeda | Media Lab | artist, graphic designer, computer scientist | |
| Thomas H. D. Mahoney | History and Political Science | Massachusetts Secretary of Elder Affairs 1979–1983 | |
| John McCarthy | Computer science | "founding father" of artificial intelligence; inventor of Lisp language | |
| Allan McCollum | Visual Arts Program | artist, writer, creator of The Shapes Project | |
| Marvin Minsky | Electrical Engineering and Computer Science, Media Laboratory | artificial intelligence | |
| William J. Mitchell | Media Laboratory | architect, writer, media guru | |
| Ernest Moniz | MIT Energy Initiative group (MITEI) | energy policy advisor, national security policy | |
| Frederic Richard Morgenthaler | MIT Research Laboratory of Electronics | electromagnetics researcher and educator | |
| Philip M. Morse | Physics | operations research, physics, acoustics | |
| Arthur Mutambara | | robotics and mechatronics; politician | |
| Nicholas Negroponte | Media Lab | OLPC project leader | |
| Donna Nelson | Biology with Nancy Hopkins, 2003; Chemical Engineering with Michael Strano, 2010 | Nelson Diversity Surveys; president of the American Chemical Society; functionalization and characterization of single-walled carbon nanotubes; president of the American Chemical Society | |
| Seymour Papert | Media Lab | education and computers | |
| Cecil Hobart Peabody | Mechanical Engineering, Naval Architecture | power engineering, marine engineering, textbooks | |
| Alex (Sandy) Pentland | Media Laboratory | human-computer interaction and social networks | |
| Ruth Perry | Literature | co-founder and founding director of the Program in Women's Studies (now Women and Gender Studies) at MIT | |
| Theodore Postol | Science, Technology, and Society | nuclear weapons expert; prominent critic of current ballistic missile defense systems | |
| Nelson Repenning | Management | system dynamics | |
| Ellen Swallow Richards | Chemistry | first woman in America accepted to any school of science and technology; first female instructor at MIT; first American woman to earn a degree in chemistry; foremost female industrial and environmental chemist in the United States in the 1800s | |
| Ron Rivest | Electrical Engineering and Computer Science | cryptographer; co-inventor of RSA; inventor of RC5, MD5 and several other cryptographic algorithms; Turing Award winner; Institute Professor | |
| Douglas T. Ross | Electrical Engineering and Computer Science | CAD pioneer | |
| Gian-Carlo Rota | Mathematics | mathematician and philosopher | |
| Frederick P. Salvucci | Civil and Environmental Engineering | civil engineer, former Massachusetts Secretary of Transportation, and principal planner of the Big Dig | |
| David G. Schaeffer | Mathematics | mathematician and James B. Duke Distinguished Professor of Mathematics at Duke University | |
| Edgar Schein | Brain and Cognitive Sciences | organizational psychologist | |
| Peter Senge | Management | learning organizations | |
| Alex K. Shalek | Chemistry, Institute for Medical Engineering and Science | single-cell genomics key opinion leader | |
| George P. Shultz | Management | United States Secretary of State, Treasury, and Labor; former professor at both the MIT Department of Economics and the MIT Sloan School of Management; earned Ph.D. in economics from MIT in 1949 | |
| David Simchi-Levi | Systems Engineering | supply chain management | |
| Peter Shor | Mathematics | mathematician, inventor of Shor's algorithm | |
| Susan Solomon | Earth, Atmospheric, and Planetary Sciences | climate scientist, discovered the ozone hole | |
| Robert Stalnaker | | philosopher, linguist | |
| John Sterman | | system dynamics | |
| Dirk Jan Struik | Mathematics | mathematician and historian of mathematics | |
| Gerald Sussman | Electrical Engineering and Computer Science | co-inventor of Scheme; research in artificial intelligence, computer languages, and orbital mechanics | |
| Sherry Turkle | Science, Technology, and Society | clinical psychologist and sociologist | |
| Kay Tye | Brain and Cognitive Sciences | neuroscientist | |
| Eric von Hippel | Economics | behavioral theorist | |
| Brian Wardle | Aeronautics and Astronautics | Boeing Assistant Professor of Aeronautics and Astronautics | |
| Christopher Weaver | Comparative Media Studies and Microphotonics Center | founder of Bethesda Softworks, visiting scientist and lecturer in engineering | |
| Evan Ziporyn | Music and Theater Arts | composer, clarinetist, Bang on a Can All-Stars | |
