= John Hauser =

John Hauser may refer to:

- John Hauser (painter) (1859–1913), American painter
- John R. Hauser, professor of marketing
- John A. Hauser (1907–1983), American businessman and philanthropist
- John Hauser (gridiron football), (1980–) American football coach

== See also ==
- John Houser (disambiguation)
