= Peter Fader =

American academic

- Citizenship: United States of America
- Education: Massachusetts Institute of Technology
- Known for: Customer lifetime value Customer centricity Customer-based corporate valuation
- Awards: Frances and Pei-Yuan Chia Professorship, 25 Marketing Technology Trailblazers,
- Scientific career
- Fields: Marketing
- Workplaces: Wharton School of the University of Pennsylvania, Theta Equity Partners
- Doctoral advisor: John R. Hauser

Peter S. Fader is the Frances and Pei-Yuan Chia Professor of Marketing at The Wharton School of the University of Pennsylvania. His research focuses on analyzing behavioral data to forecast customer purchasing behavior.

== Career ==
Fader was introduced to marketing by Professor Leigh McAlister while studying mathematics as an undergraduate at MIT. In a later interview, Fader described McAlister as his "fairy godmother" in his marketing career.

Fader works with firms across various industries, including telecommunications, financial services, gaming and entertainment, retailing, and pharmaceuticals. Managerial applications focus on topics such as management of customer relationships, lifetime value of the customer, and sales predictions for new products. Much of his research highlights consistent patterns in consumer behavior across these industries and other sectors.

In addition to his roles at Wharton, Fader co-founded the predictive analytics firm Zodiac in 2015, which was acquired by Nike in 2018. He subsequently co-founded and still works at Theta Equity Partners to commercialize his more recent work on customer-based corporate valuation.

== Works ==
Fader is the author of Customer Centricity: Focus on the Right Customers for Strategic Advantage and co-authored with Sarah E. Toms, of he Customer Centricity Playbook: Implement a Winning Strategy Driven by Customer Lifetime Value.

== Awards ==
He is the current recipient of the Pei-Yuan Chia Professorship. He has held this award since 2003.

He was named one of the 25 Marketing Technology Trailblazers by Advertising Age.
