= Repenning =

Repenning is a surname. Notable people with the surname include:

- Alexander Repenning, American computer scientist
- Charles Repenning (1922–2005), American paleontologist and zoologist
- Nelson Repenning, American business scholar
