= Yuan Cao =

Chinese electrical engineer and physicist

- 曹原
- Born: 1996 (age 29–30); Chengdu, Sichuan, China
- Education: University of Science and Technology of China (BS); University of Michigan (Exchange); Massachusetts Institute of Technology (MS, PhD)
- Scientific career
- Fields: Twistronics
- Website: caoyuan.scripts.mit.edu

Yuan Cao (Chinese: 曹原; pinyin: Cáo Yuán) is a Chinese electrical engineer and physicist. His research is focused on the properties of two-dimensional materials. He discovered that a stack of two sheets of graphene, cooled to 1.7 K, could act as a superconductor or as an insulator when exposed to an electric field. In 2018, Nature chose him as one of 10 people who mattered that year in science, calling him a "graphene wrangler."

== Early life and education ==
Cao was born in Chengdu, Sichuan, China, in 1996. He attended Shenzhen Yaohua Experimental School from 2007 to 2010.

Cao was admitted to and started his undergraduate education at the Special Class for the Gifted Young of the University of Science and Technology of China in 2010. He traveled to the United States and studied at the University of Michigan as an undergraduate exchange student from 2012 to 2013. In 2014, Cao graduated from the University of Science and Technology of China, receiving a Bachelor of Science with a major in physics. He went to the Massachusetts Institute of Technology in 2014 and received a Doctor of Philosophy in electrical engineering in 2020.

== Career ==
After graduation in 2020, he began his postdoctoral research in Pablo Jarillo-Herrero's group studying graphene.

== See also ==
- Bilayer graphene
