= Efthimios Kaxiras =

Greek-American materials scientist

- Ευθύμιος Καξήρας
- Education: National Technical University of Athens; Massachusetts Institute of Technology
- Known for: Twistronics
- Scientific career
- Fields: Condensed matter physics; Materials science
- Workplaces: IBM Research; United States Naval Research Laboratory; Harvard University; École Polytechnique Fédérale de Lausanne
- Thesis: Ab Initio theory of polar surfaces of binary compound semiconductors (1987)
- Doctoral advisor: John Joannopoulos
- Doctoral students: Martin Z. Bazant; Amanda Randles
- Website: efthimioskaxiras.scholars.harvard.edu

Efthimios "Tim" Kaxiras (Note: Greek: Επίτιμος Καθηγητής) is a Greek-American condensed matter physicist and materials scientist, who is John Hasbrouck Van Vleck Professor of Pure and Applied Physics at Harvard University. Known for his work in computational materials science, he and his research group have introduced the term "twistronics."

Briefly studying electrical engineering at National Technical University of Athens, Kaxiras received his bachelor's degree in physics from Massachusetts Institute of Technology in 1981. He completed his doctoral studies in physics at MIT in 1987 under the supervision of John Joannopoulos. Working at IBM Research and United States Naval Research Laboratory, he became a faculty member at Harvard University in 1991. In addition to his tenure at Harvard University, he held appointments in École Polytechnique Fédérale de Lausanne and University of Ioannina.

Kaxiras is a Fellow of the Institute of Physics, and a member of Materials Research Society and American Chemical Society. In 2003, he became a fellow of American Physical Society for his "contributions to understanding the properties of materials, through simulations and the development of new first-principles, empirical and multiscale computational methods."

== Selected publications ==
Books

- Kaxiras, Efthimios (2010). Atomic and Electronic Structure of Solids. Cambridge University Press. ISBN 9780511755545.
- Kaxiras, Efthimios; Joannopoulos, John D. (2019). Quantum Theory of Materials. Cambridge University Press. ISBN 9780521117111.

Journal articles

- Copel, M.; Reuter, M. C.; Kaxiras, Efthimios; Tromp, R. M. (1989). "Surfactants in epitaxial growth". Physical Review Letters. 63 (6): 632. doi:10.1103/PhysRevLett.63.632.
- Rappe, Andrew M.; Rabe, Karin M.; Kaxiras, Efthimios; Joannopoulos, J. D. (1990). "Optimized pseudopotentials". Physical Review B. 41: 1227. doi:10.1103/PhysRevB.41.1227.
- Broughton, Jeremy Q.; Abraham, Farid F.; Bernstein, Noam; Kaxiras, Efthimios (1999). "Concurrent coupling of length scales: Methodology and application". Physical Review B. 60 (4): 2391. doi:10.1103/PhysRevB.60.2391.
- Carr, Stephen; Massatt, Daniel; Fang, Shiang; Cazeaux, Paul; Luskin, Mitchell; Kaxiras, Efthimios (2017). "Twistronics: Manipulating the electronic properties of two-dimensional layered structures through their twist angle". Physical Review B. 95 (7) 075420. arXiv:1611.00649. Bibcode:2017PhRvB..95g5420C. doi:10.1103/PhysRevB.95.075420. S2CID 27148700.
- Cao, Yuan; Fatemi, Valla; Fang, Shiang; Watanabe, Kenji; Taniguchi, Takashi; Kaxiras, Efthimios; Jarillo-Herrero, Pablo (2018). "Unconventional superconductivity in magic-angle graphene superlattices". Nature. 556: 43–50. arXiv:1803.02342. doi:10.1038/nature26160.
- Cao, Yuan; Fatemi, Valla; Demir, Ahmet; Fang, Shiang; Tomarken, Spencer L.; Luo, Jason Y.; Sanchez-Yamagishi, Javier D.; Watanabe, Kenji; Taniguchi, Takashi; Kaxiras, Efthimios; Ashoori, Ray C.; Jarillo-Herrero, Pablo (2018). "Correlated insulator behaviour at half-filling in magic-angle graphene superlattices". Nature. 556: 80–84. arXiv:1802.00553. doi:10.1038/nature26154.
- Yoo, Hyobin; Engelke, Rebecca; Carr, Stephen; Fang, Shiang; Zhang, Kuan; Cazeaux, Paul; Sung, Suk Hyun; Hovden, Robert; Tsen, Adam W.; Taniguchi, Takashi; Watanabe, Kenji; Yi, Gyu-Chul; Kim, Miyoung; Luskin, Mitchell; Tadmor, Ellad B.; Kaxiras, Efthimios; Kim, Philip (2019). "Atomic and electronic reconstruction at the van der Waals interface in twisted bilayer graphene". Nature Materials. 18: 448–453. arXiv:1804.03806. doi:10.1038/s41563-019-0346-z.
