= Brian Wardle =

Brian Wardle may refer to:

- Brian Wardle (academic) (born 1969), professor of aeronautics and astronautics
- Brian Wardle (basketball) (born 1979), American college basketball coach
