= Povinelli =

Povinelli is an Italian surname. Notable people with the surname include:

- Elizabeth Povinelli, professor of anthropology and gender studies
- Mark Povinelli (born 1971), American stage, television and movie actor
- Michelle Povinelli (born 1975), American physicist
- Roland Povinelli (born 1941), French politician
