= Amanda Randles =

American computer scientist

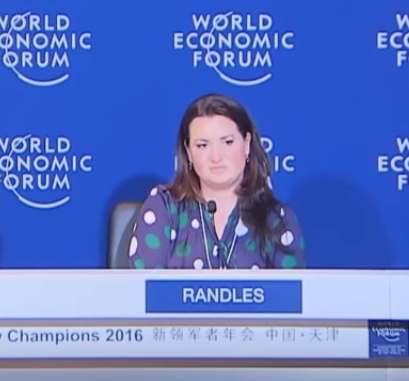
- Randles at the WEF Summer Davos in 2016
- Education: Duke University; Harvard University
- Awards: ACM Prize in Computing (2023); NIH Pioneer (2022); NSF CAREER (2019); Grace Murray Hopper Award (2017)
- Scientific career
- Fields: Computer science; Biomedical engineering
- Institutions: Duke University
- Thesis: Modeling Cardiovascular Hemodynamics Using the Lattice Boltzmann Method on Massively Parallel Supercomputers (2013)
- Doctoral advisor: Efthimios Kaxiras; Hanspeter Pfister

Amanda Randles is an American computer scientist who is the Alfred Winborne and Victoria Stover Mordecai Associate Professor of Biomedical Sciences at Duke University. Randles is an associate professor of biomedical engineering with secondary appointments in computer science, mathematics, and mechanical engineering and materials science. She is a member of the Duke Cancer Institute. Her research interests include biomedical simulation, machine learning, computational fluid dynamics, and high-performance computing.

== Early career and education ==
In high school, Randles attended the Utica Center for Math, Science, and Technology, where she learned computer programming and its applications in the sciences. She also participated in Science Olympiad and FIRST Robotics.

Randles attended Duke University, where she completed a B.A. in physics and computer science in 2005. After working for three years as a software developer on the IBM Blue Gene project, she went to Harvard University to earn an S.M. in computer science (2010) and a PhD in applied physics (2013) advised by Efthimios Kaxiras and Hanspeter Pfister. She was awarded an NSF Graduate Research Fellowship (GRFP) and in 2011, she was awarded a Computational Science Graduate Fellowship by the Krell Institute. She subsequently completed a practicum at Lawrence Livermore National Laboratory and was a visiting scientist at Franziska Michor's laboratory in the Dana–Farber Cancer Institute.

== Academic career ==
Randles joined the Duke University Biomedical Engineering Department in 2015, where she is currently serving as the Alfred Winborne and Victoria Stover Mordecai Associate Professor of Biomedical Sciences. She received tenure in 2023 in Biomedical Engineering and has secondary appointments in mathematics, computer science, and mechanical and materials science. She is also a member of the Duke Cancer Institute.

=== Research ===
Randles' research interests are biomedical simulation and high-performance computing; specifically, her focus is developing computational tools that can examine the behavior of different diseases, from atherosclerosis to cancer. Randles and her research group have developed fluid dynamics simulation software capable of modeling blood flowing throughout a human body based on full-body CT and MRI scans, dubbed HARVEY after the physician William Harvey. Possible applications include examining how different medical interventions in cardiovascular disease impact the circulatory system and modeling the flow of singular cancer cells through the system.

In 2018, Randles was one of ten researchers selected to test simulation-based projects on the Aurora exascale supercomputer in 2021, as part of the Aurora Early Science Program at the Argonne National Laboratory. She was awarded an NSF CAREER Award in May 2020 to support her work on HARVEY.

== Awards and honors ==
In 2023, she was warded the NIH Pioneer award to support her work combining wearables with physics-based models. She is a Fellow of the National Academy of Inventors. For her work on ventilator splitting during the Covid-19 pandemic, she was awarded the Alexandra Jane Noble Epiphany Science Inspiration Award. In 2014, Randles was awarded the NIH Director's Early Independence Award. She was named to the 2015 World Economic Forum Young Scientist List for her work on the "design of large-scale parallel applications targeting problems in physics". In 2017, she was awarded the Grace Murray Hopper Award and was later named to the MIT Technology Review Innovators Under 35, both given for her work on HARVEY. In January 2024, she was named an ACM Distinguished Member. She was the 2023 recipient of the ACM Prize in Computing for her contributions to "computational health through innovative algorithms, tools, and high performance computing methods for diagnosing and treating a variety of human diseases".

== Selected publications ==
- Bagrat Grigoryan; Samantha J Paulsen; Daniel C Corbett; et al. (May 1, 2019). "Multivascular networks and functional intravascular topologies within biocompatible hydrogels". Science. 364 (6439): 458–464. Bibcode:2019Sci...364..458G. doi:10.1126/SCIENCE.AAV9750. ISSN 0036-8075. PMID 31048486. Wikidata Q91711085.
- Vanessa Almendro; Yu-Kang Cheng; Amanda Randles; et al. (January 23, 2014). "Inference of tumor evolution during chemotherapy by computational modeling and in situ analysis of genetic and phenotypic cellular diversity". Cell Reports. 6 (3): 514–527. doi:10.1016/J.CELREP.2013.12.041. ISSN 2211-1247. PMC 3928845. PMID 24462293. Wikidata Q37592617.
- D Keyes; L C McInnes; C Woodward; et al. (November 29, 2012). "Multiphysics simulations: challenges and opportunities". International Journal of High Performance Computing Applications. 27 (1): 4–83. doi:10.2172/1034263. ISSN 1094-3420. Wikidata Q58389771.
- Randles, Amanda; Draeger, Erik W.; Oppelstrup, Tomas; Krauss, Liam; Gunnels, John A. (November 15, 2015). "Massively parallel models of the human circulatory system". Proceedings of the International Conference for High Performance Computing, Networking, Storage and Analysis. pp. 1–11. doi:10.1145/2807591.2807676. ISBN 9781450337236. OSTI 1241975. S2CID 17681519.
- Randles, Amanda Peters; Kale, Vivek; Hammond, Jeff; Gropp, William; Kaxiras, Efthimios (May 2013). "Performance Analysis of the Lattice Boltzmann Model Beyond Navier-Stokes". 2013 IEEE 27th International Symposium on Parallel and Distributed Processing. pp. 1063–1074. doi:10.1109/IPDPS.2013.109. ISBN 978-1-4673-6066-1. S2CID 14599817.
