= Eva Andrei =

American condensed matter physicist

- Born: Eva Yocheved Andrei; Bucharest, Romania
- Education: Tel Aviv University; Rutgers University
- Scientific career
- Thesis: Investigation of fourth sound propagation in He II in the presence of superflow (1981)

Eva Yocheved Andrei is an American condensed matter physicist, a Distinguished Professor, and a Board of Governors Professor at Rutgers University. Her research focuses on emergent properties of matter arising from the collective behavior of many particles, especially low-dimensional phenomena under low temperatures and high magnetic fields.

== Education and training ==
Andrei was born in Bucharest, Romania. She received her bachelor's degree in physics from Tel Aviv University in Israel and her Ph.D. in physics from Rutgers University in the United States. After receiving her education, she worked as a postdoctoral fellow at Bell Labs, Murray Hill NJ, and CEA Paris-Saclay.

== Career ==
Andrei began her independent career in 1987 as an assistant professor at Rutgers. One of her first major contributions was establishing the existence of a Wigner crystal in a 2D electron plasma. More recently she has made major contributions to the study of graphene, including the detection of ballistic transport of charge carriers and the observation of Van Hove singularity in twisted bilayer graphene. Andrei's discovery of the fractional quantum Hall effect in graphene was one of Science magazine's top ten discoveries for the year 2009. Through studying moiré patterns in twisted sheets of graphene, Andrei observed the alignment of electrons which could facilitate the use of graphene for superconductors. Her research has also presented the possibility that graphene could be used to cool supercomputers. It has revealed new ways of making flat bands within twisted graphene, which can be used to make superlattice structures.

Eva Andrei received the Society of Physics Students Outstanding Teaching Award in 2014. As of January 2024, Andrei still facilitates research through Rutgers and as a postdoctoral fellow at Bell Labs. This includes experimental research on the systems of reduced dimensionality at high magnetic fields and low temperatures. This research has led to many discoveries in the field of superconductivity, charge density waves, and magnetism.

In 2026, Eva Andrei was awarded the Kavli Prize jointly with Pablo Jarillo-Herrero and Allan H. MacDonald "for foundational work that established the field of Twistronics".

== Selected publications ==
- Du, Xu; Skachko, Ivan; Barker, Anthony; Andrei, Eva Y. (2008). "Approaching ballistic transport in suspended graphene". Nature Nanotechnology. 3 (8): 491–495. arXiv:0802.2933. Bibcode:2008NatNa...3..491D. doi:10.1038/nnano.2008.199. ISSN 1748-3387. PMID 18685637. S2CID 118441080.
- Li, Guohong; Luican, Adina; Andrei, Eva Y. (2009-04-29). "Scanning Tunneling Spectroscopy of Graphene on Graphite". Physical Review Letters. 102 (17) 176804. arXiv:0803.4016. Bibcode:2009PhRvL.102q6804L. doi:10.1103/PhysRevLett.102.176804. ISSN 0031-9007. PMID 19518809. S2CID 9212261.
- Du, Xu; Skachko, Ivan; Duerr, Fabian; Luican, Adina; Andrei, Eva Y. (2009). "Fractional quantum Hall effect and insulating phase of Dirac electrons in graphene". Nature. 462 (7270): 192–195. arXiv:0910.2532. Bibcode:2009Natur.462..192D. doi:10.1038/nature08522. ISSN 1476-4687. PMID 19829294. S2CID 2927627.
- Li, Guohong; Luican, A.; Lopes dos Santos, J. M. B.; Castro Neto, A. H.; Reina, A.; Kong, J.; Andrei, E. Y. (2010). "Observation of Van Hove singularities in twisted graphene layers". Nature Physics. 6 (2): 109–113. arXiv:0912.2102. Bibcode:2010NatPh...6..109L. doi:10.1038/nphys1463. ISSN 1745-2481. S2CID 8626222.
- Luican, A.; Li, Guohong; Reina, A.; Kong, J.; Nair, R. R.; Novoselov, K. S.; Geim, A. K.; Andrei, E. Y. (2011-03-21). "Single-Layer Behavior and Its Breakdown in Twisted Graphene Layers". Physical Review Letters. 106 (12) 126802. arXiv:1010.4032. Bibcode:2011PhRvL.106l6802L. doi:10.1103/PhysRevLett.106.126802. ISSN 0031-9007. PMID 21517338. S2CID 12429041.

== Awards and honors ==
- 1991 - French CEA medal of physics
- 2003 - Fellow of the American Physical Society
- 2010 - Fellow of the American Association for the Advancement of Science
- 2010 - Rutgers University Trustees Award for Excellence in Research
- 2012 - Fellow of the American Academy of Arts and Sciences
- 2013 - Fellow of the National Academy of Sciences
- 2014 - Society of Physics Students Outstanding Teaching Award
- 2023 - Mildred Dresselhaus Prize in Nanoscience and Nanomaterials.
- 2026 - Kavli Prize in the category of "Nanoscience".
