= Allan H. MacDonald =

Canadian-American physicist (born 1951)

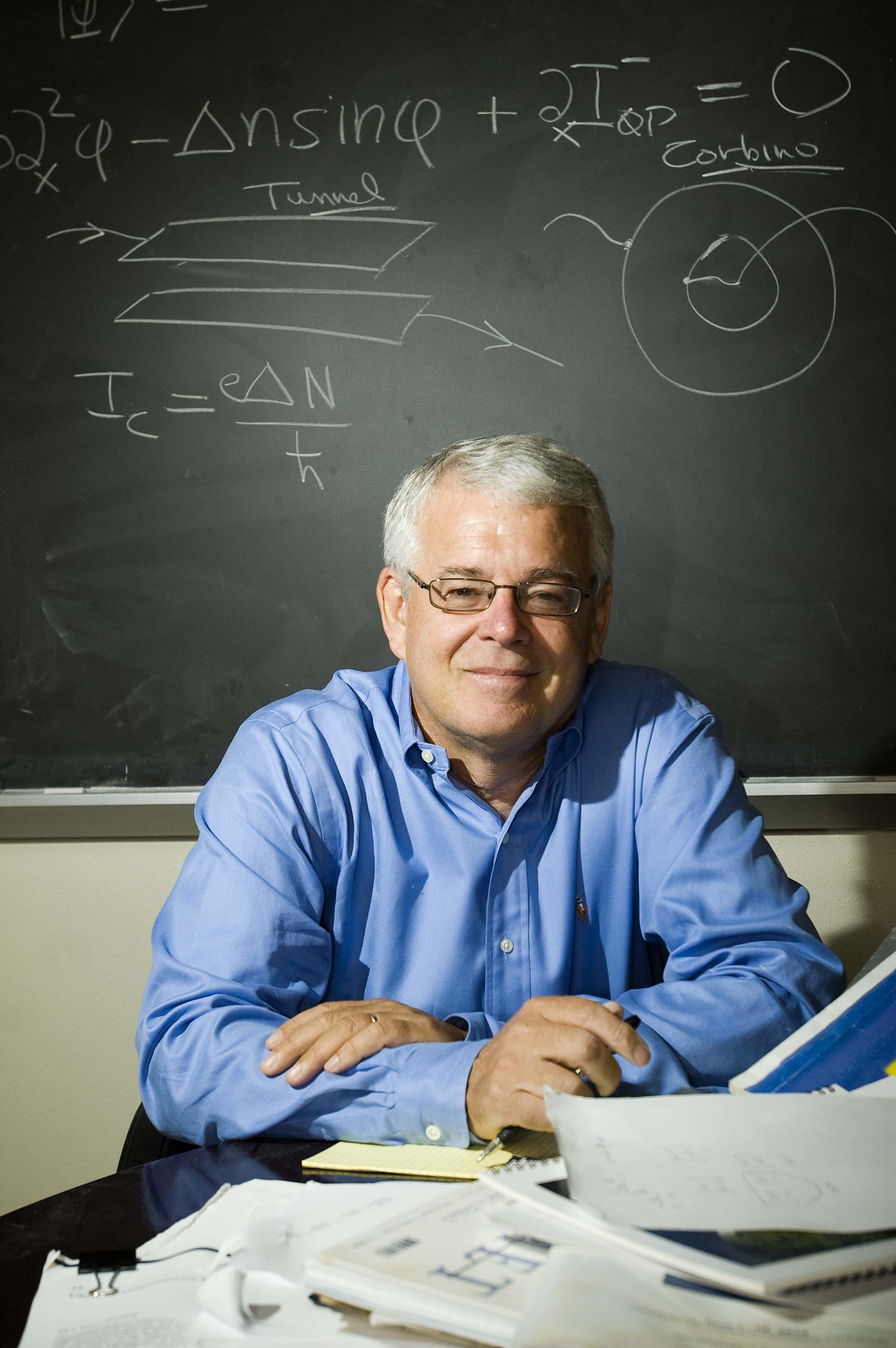
- Born: December 1, 1951 (age 74); Antigonish, Nova Scotia, Canada
- Education: St. Francis Xavier University, University of Toronto
- Awards: Oliver E. Buckley Condensed Matter Prize (2007); Wolf Prize in Physics (2020); Citation Laureate (2024); BBVA Foundation Frontiers of Knowledge Award (2026)
- Scientific career
- Fields: Condensed matter physics
- Workplaces: University of Texas at Austin, Indiana University, National Research Council Canada
- Doctoral advisor: S.H. Vosko
- Website: https://web2.ph.utexas.edu/~macdgrp/

Allan H. MacDonald (born December 1, 1951) is a theoretical condensed matter physicist and the Sid W. Richardson Foundation Regents Chair Professor of Physics at The University of Texas at Austin. His research interests are centered on the electronic properties of electrons in metals and semiconductors. He is well known for his work on correlated many-electron states in low-dimensional systems. In 2020, he became one of the laureates of the Wolf Prize in Physics, for predicting the magic angle that turns twisted bilayer graphene into a superconductor.

== Education and early life ==
He was born in Antigonish, Nova Scotia, Canada, and attended local schools completing a B.S. at St. Francis Xavier University in 1973. He completed his Ph.D.in physics at the University of Toronto in 1978, working with S.H. Vosko on relativistic generalizations of density functional theory, and on the application of density functional theory to magnetism in metals.

== Research and career ==
Prior to joining the University of Texas, he worked at the Ottawa laboratory of the National Research Council Canada (1978–1987) and at Indiana University (1987–2000). He has held visiting positions at the Swiss Federal Institute of Technology in Zurich and the Max Planck Institute for Solid State Research in Stuttgart, Germany.

MacDonald's research has focused on new or unexplained phenomena related to the quantum physics of interacting electrons in materials. He has contributed to theories of the integer and fractional quantum Hall effects, spintronics in metals and semiconductors, topological Bloch bands and momentum-space Berry curvature phenomena, correlated electron-hole fluids and exciton and polariton condensates, and two-dimensional materials.

Building on earlier continuum models of twisted bilayers which predicted twisted graphene bilayers would have a much lower Fermi velocity than in monolayer graphene, MacDonald and Rafi Bistritzer -- a former postdoctoral researcher in MacDonald's lab -- proposed in 2011 that the Fermi velocity in graphene bilayers could vanish at specific "magic" relative orientation angles. They predicted that this quenching of kinetic energy would make it possible to realize strong correlation physics, foreshadowing later developments in the field of twistronics.

In 2018, Pablo Jarillo-Herrero, an experimentalist at the Massachusetts Institute of Technology, confirmed these predictions by observing correlated insulating states in magic-angle twisted bilayer graphene. At roughly 1.1 degrees of rotation, the interference between the two graphene lattices generates a moiré pattern that acts as an effective superlattice, resulting in exceptionally flat electronic bands where electron-electron interactions dominate. Unexpectedly, Jarillo-Herrero's group also discovered that doping the system slightly away from these insulating states induced superconductivity. This discovery of tunable strongly correlated phases has led to intense research into moiré materials for quantum applications.

MacDonald's recent work is focused on anticipating new physics in moiré superlattices, and on achieving a full understanding of magic-angle bilayer graphene and transition-metal dichalcogenide moiré superlattice systems.

== Honors and awards ==
MacDonald received the Canadian Association of Physicists's Herzberg Medal in 1987, the Oliver E. Buckley Prize of the American Physical Society in 2007 with James P. Eisenstein and Steven Girvin, the Ernst Mach Honorary Medal of the Czech Academy of Sciences in 2012, and the Wolf Prize in Physics in 2020 with Bistritzer and Jarrillo-Herrero. He was elected to the American Academy of Arts and Sciences in 2005 and the National Academy of the Sciences in 2010. He was named a 2024 Citation Laureate by Clarivate. In 2026, MacDonald and Jarillo-Herrero were named winners of the BBVA Foundation Frontiers of Knowledge Award in the category of "Basic Sciences". Also in 2026 he received the Kavli Prize in the category of "Nanoscience", along with Jarillo-Herrero and Eva Andrei.

== Personal life ==
MacDonald is the second of eight children of David Roy (Jack) MacDonald and Elizabeth Jean (Betty) Sears. He grew up in Antigonish, Nova Scotia in the 1950s and 1960s, a town of 5000 people dominated at the time by 18th and 19th century Scottish and Irish immigrants. His namesake grandfather was a coal miner in New Waterford, N.S. and his mother was the daughter of a prominent local businessman and a graduate of Columbia University who wanted her children to be unafraid of the world 'from away.' MacDonald married Susan Wayling in Jimtown, Antigonish County, N.S. in 1974. They have two children, Erin (born 1977) and Brendan (born 1978) and four grandchildren living in Austin and San Francisco. Allan and Susan maintain a seasonal residence in Jimtown overlooking St. George's Bay - the backdrop of their summer days from youth to old age.

== Select publications ==
- MacDonald, AH; Vosko, SH (August 14, 1979). "A relativistic density functional formalism". Journal of Physics C: Solid State Physics. 12 (15): 2977. Bibcode:1979JPhC...12.2977M. doi:10.1088/0022-3719/12/15/007.
- MacDonald, AH; Picket, WE; Koelling, DD (May 20, 1980). "A linearised relativistic augmented-plane-wave method utilising approximate pure spin basis functions". Journal of Physics C: Solid State Physics. 13 (14): 2675. Bibcode:1980JPhC...13.2675M. doi:10.1088/0022-3719/13/14/009.
- Girvin, SM; MacDonald, Allan H; Platzman, PM (February 15, 1986). "Magneto-roton theory of collective excitations in the fractional quantum Hall effect". Physical Review B. 33 (4): 2481–2494. Bibcode:1986PhRvB..33.2481G. doi:10.1103/PhysRevB.33.2481. PMID 9938586.
- MacDonald, Allan H; Girvin, Steven M; Yoshioka, D (June 1, 1988). "t/U expansion for the Hubbard model". Physical Review B. 37 (16): 9753–9756. Bibcode:1988PhRvB..37.9753M. doi:10.1103/PhysRevB.37.9753. PMID 9944372.
- Moon, K; Mori, H; Yang, Kun; Girvin, SM; MacDonald, AH; Zheng, L; Yoshioka, D; Zhang, Shou-Cheng (February 15, 1995). "Spontaneous interlayer coherence in double-layer quantum Hall systems: Charged vortices and Kosterlitz-Thouless phase transitions". Physical Review B. 51 (8): 5138–5170. arXiv:cond-mat/9407031. Bibcode:1995PhRvB..51.5138M. doi:10.1103/PhysRevB.51.5138. PMID 9979391.
- Jungwirth, T; Niu, Q; MacDonald, Allan H (May 6, 2002). "Anomalous Hall effect in ferromagnetic semiconductors". Physical Review Letters. 88 (20) 207208. arXiv:cond-mat/0110484. Bibcode:2002PhRvL..88t7208J. doi:10.1103/PhysRevLett.88.207208. PMID 12005602.
- Yao, Yugui; Kleinman, Leonard; MacDonald, AH; Sinova, Jairo; Jungwirth, T; Wang, Ding-sheng; Wang, Enge; Niu, Qian (January 22, 2004). "First principles calculation of anomalous Hall conductivity in ferromagnetic bcc Fe". Physical Review Letters. 92 (3) 037204. arXiv:cond-mat/0307337. Bibcode:2004PhRvL..92c7204Y. doi:10.1103/PhysRevLett.92.037204. PMID 14753904.
- Eisenstein, JP; MacDonald, Allan H (December 9, 2004). "Bose–Einstein condensation of excitons in bilayer electron systems". Nature. 432 (7018): 691–694. arXiv:cond-mat/0404113. Bibcode:2004Natur.432..691E. doi:10.1038/nature03081. PMID 15592403.
- Nomura, Kentaro; MacDonald, Allan H. (June 28, 2006). "Quantum Hall ferromagnetism in graphene". Physical Review Letters. 96 (25) 256602. arXiv:cond-mat/0604113. Bibcode:2006PhRvL..96y6602N. doi:10.1103/PhysRevLett.96.256602. PMID 16907331.
- Zhang, Fan; Min, Hongki; Polini, Marco; MacDonald, AH (January 4, 2010). "Spontaneous inversion symmetry breaking in graphene bilayers". Physical Review B. 81 (4) 041402. arXiv:0907.2448. Bibcode:2010PhRvB..81d1402Z. doi:10.1103/PhysRevB.81.041402.
- Bistritzer, Rafi; MacDonald, Allan H (July 5, 2011). "Moiré bands in twisted double-layer graphene". Proceedings of the National Academy of Sciences. 108 (30): 12233–12237. arXiv:1009.4203. Bibcode:2011PNAS..10812233B. doi:10.1073/pnas.1108174108. PMC 204362. PMID 3145708.
- Khanikaev, Alexander B; Mousavi, S Hossein; Tse, Wang-Kong; Kargarian, Mehdi; MacDonald, Allan H; Shvets, Gennady (December 16, 2012). "Photonic topological insulators". Nature Materials. 12 (3): 233–239. arXiv:1204.5700. doi:10.1038/nmat3520. PMID 23241532.
- Chen, Hua; Niu, Qian; MacDonald, Allan H (January 10, 2014). "Anomalous Hall effect arising from noncollinear antiferromagnetism". Physical Review Letters. 112 (1) 017205. arXiv:1309.4041. Bibcode:2014PhRvL.112a7205C. doi:10.1103/PhysRevLett.112.017205. PMID 24483927.
- Ji, Hengxing; Zhao, Xin; Qiao, Zhenhua; Jung, Jeil; Zhu, Yanwu; Lu, Yalin; Zhang, Li Li; MacDonald, Allan H.; Ruoff, Rodney S (February 21, 2014). "Capacitance of carbon-based electrical double-layer capacitors". Nature Communications. 5 (1): 3317. Bibcode:2014NatCo...5.3317J. doi:10.1038/ncomms4317. PMID 24557361.
- Wu, Fengcheng; Lovorn, Timothy; Tutuc, Emanuel; MacDonald, Allan H (July 10, 2018). "Hubbard model physics in transition metal dichalcogenide moiré bands". Physical Review Letters. 121 (2) 026402. arXiv:1804.03151. Bibcode:2018PhRvL.121b6402W. doi:10.1103/PhysRevLett.121.026402. PMID 30085734.
- Wu, Fengcheng; Lovorn, Timothy; Tutuc, Emanuel; Martin, Ivar; MacDonald, AH (February 28, 2019). "Topological insulators in twisted transition metal dichalcogenide homobilayers". Physical Review Letters. 122 (8) 086402. arXiv:1807.03311. Bibcode:2019PhRvL.122h6402W. doi:10.1103/PhysRevLett.122.086402. PMID 30932597.
