= Lise Meitner Distinguished Lecture =

Annual lecture in Stockholm, Sweden

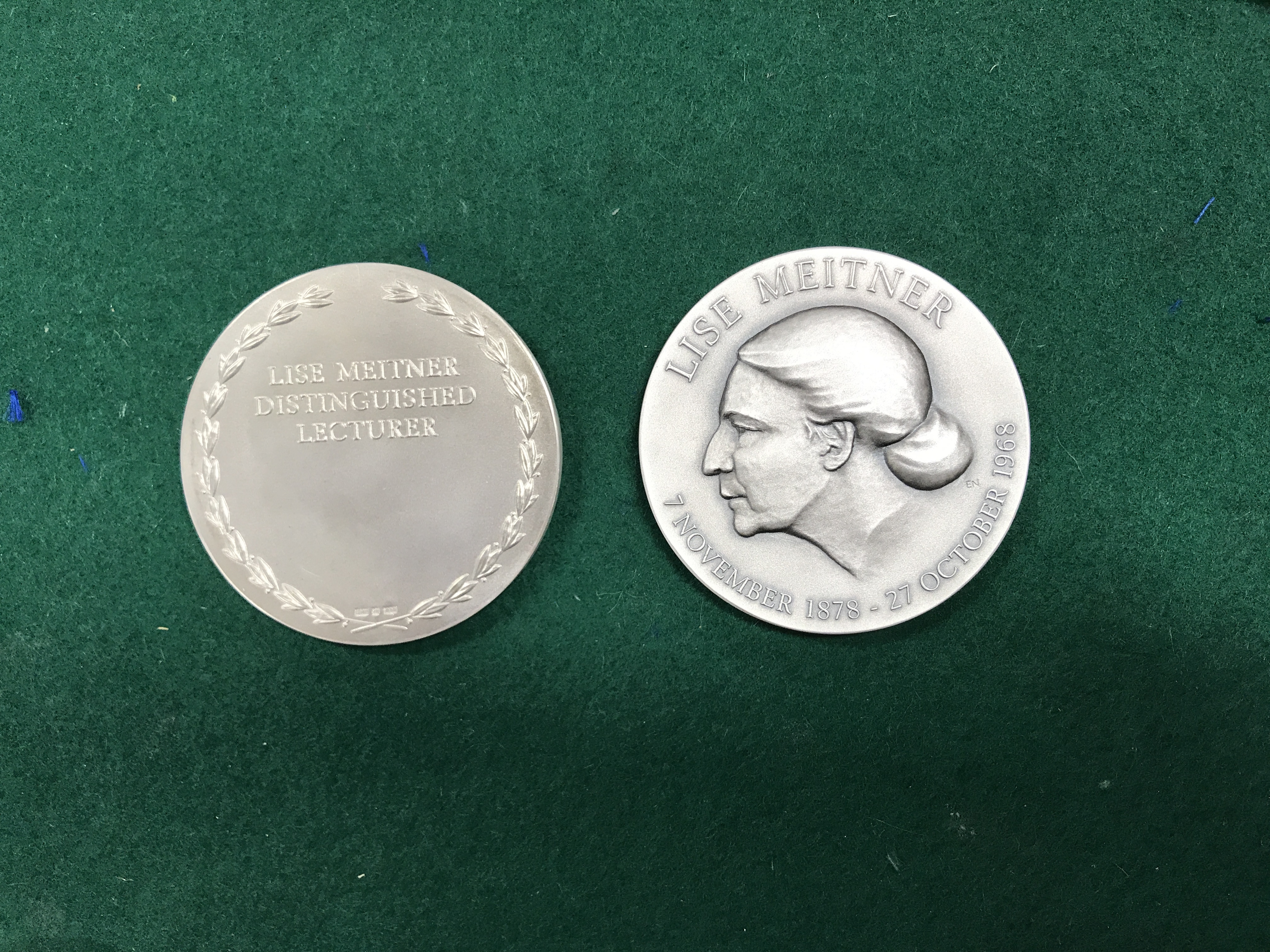
Lise Meitner Distinguished Lecturer Medal

Lise Meitner Distinguished Lecture and Medal is a colloquium-style distinguished lecture that takes place at AlbaNova University Center in Stockholm on annual basis. The lecture commemorates Lise Meitner, who spent a substantial part of her career in Stockholm. AlbaNova University Center hosts physics departments of the Royal Institute of Technology, Stockholm University and Nordita.

The Lise Meitner Distinguished Lecture is sponsored by Royal Swedish Academy of Sciences through its Nobel Committee for Physics.

== Past lectures ==
- 2015: Frank Wilczek (MIT) – Physics in 100 years
- 2016: Bert Halperin (Harvard University) – Defects with Character: Zero-Energy Majorana Modes in Condensed-Matter Systems
- 2017: Duncan Haldane (Princeton University) – Topological Quantum Matter and Entanglement
- 2018: Lene Vestergaard Hau (Harvard University) The art of taming light
- 2019: Michael Berry (Bristol University) Geometric phases and the separation of the world
- 2020: Immanuel Bloch (Max-Planck-Institute of Quantum Optics, Garching)
- 2021: Pablo Jarillo-Herrero (MIT)
- 2022: Peter Shor (MIT)
- 2023: Jun Ye (NIST)
- 2025: Anne_L'Huillier (Lund University)

== See also ==
- Lise Meitner Lectures
- Meitner Medal
- Oskar Klein Memorial Lecture
- List of physics awards
