= Leslie Kolodziejski =

American physicist

Leslie Ann Kolodziejski
- Born: July 31, 1958 (age 68)
- Education: Purdue University
- Known for: Photonics; Molecular-beam epitaxy
- Awards: Presidential Young Investigator Award
- Scientific career
- Workplaces: Purdue University; Massachusetts Institute of Technology

Leslie Ann Kolodziejski (born July 31, 1958) is an American professor of electrical engineering at the Massachusetts Institute of Technology. She works on fabricating novel photonic devices after synthesizing the constituent material via molecular-beam epitaxy. She is a recipient of the Presidential Young Investigator Award from the National Science Foundation and is a fellow of The Optical Society.

== Early life and education ==
Kolodziejski earned her undergraduate and graduate degrees at Purdue University, completing her bachelor's degree in 1983 and Master's in 1984. She received her Ph.D. from Purdue University in 1986, where she worked on molecular-beam epitaxy.

== Research and career ==
Kolodziejski joined the Electrical and Computer Engineering Department at Purdue University as an assistant professor in 1986. She was awarded the National Science Foundation Presidential Young Investigator Award from 1987 to 1993 for researching potential uses of molecular-beam epitaxy with photo-excitation, for designing more efficient doping processes of zinc selenide and for studying the resulting product's properties. A simultaneous United States Naval Research Laboratory Fellowship was awarded in 1989 to determine the optimum growth parameters for the chemical beam epitaxy of zinc selenide and comparing the product specifications with that obtained via molecular beam epitaxy.

She moved to the Massachusetts Institute of Technology (MIT) in 1988 to continue to work on epitaxial deposition. In 1992, Kolodziejski was appointed to the Karl van Tassel Career Development Chair and in 1993, to the Esther and Harold E. Edgerton Career Development Chair. Kolodziejski was made full professor in the faculty of electrical engineering and computer science (EECS) in 1999, where she currently teaches at both undergraduate and postgraduate level while leading the Integrated Photonic Devices and Materials Group and the Nanoprecision Deposition Laboratory.

=== Academic service ===
Kolodziejski has served on the editorial boards of Applied Physics Letters and the Journal of Applied Physics. She is a member of the Truth Values Community, which looks to create a better community for women graduate students at MIT through a pairing of science and arts. She is also the founder of Leaders in Life, an organization which works to foster leadership among women graduate students.

In 2015, Kolodziejski was awarded an Alfred P. Sloan Foundation award to create a University Centre of Exemplary Mentoring. She is also a mentor for the Minority PhD program (MPhD).

=== Awards and honors ===
In 2011, Kolodziejski was elected as a fellow of The Optical Society. She was the recipient of the Faculty Ambassador Award, which recognizes "enhancing the experience for students at MIT that transcends the boundaries of the classroom" as well as enthusiastic support for multiculturalism and diversity. Other awards and recognition include:

- Office of Naval Research, Young Investigator Award
- National Science Foundation, Presidential Young Investigator Award

== Selected publications ==
- Magden, Emir Salih; Li, Nanxi; Raval, Manan; Poulton, Christopher V.; Ruocco, Alfonso; Singh, Neetesh; Vermeulen, Diedrik; Ippen, Erich P.; Kolodziejski, Leslie A.; Watts, Michael R. (1 August 2018). "Transmissive silicon photonic dichroic filters with spectrally selective waveguides". Nature Communications. 9 (1): 3009. Bibcode:2018NatCo...9.3009M. doi:10.1038/s41467-018-05287-1. PMC 6070617. PMID 30068975.

== See also ==
- John Joannopoulos, fellow MIT physicist and collaborator of Kolodziejski's
- List of emerging material science technologies
- List of Massachusetts Institute of Technology faculty
- Materials science
- Women in physics
