= Bilayer graphene =

Material consisting of two layers of graphene

Bilayer graphene is a material consisting of two layers of graphene. One of the first reports of bilayer graphene was in the seminal 2004 Science paper by Geim and colleagues, in which they described devices "which contained just one, two, or three atomic layers"

== Structure ==
Bilayer graphene can exist in the AB, or Bernal-stacked form, where half of the atoms lie directly over the center of a hexagon in the lower graphene sheet, and half of the atoms lie over an atom, or, less commonly, in the AA form, in which the layers are exactly aligned. In Bernal stacked graphene, twin boundaries are common; transitioning from AB to BA stacking. Twisted layers, where one layer is rotated relative to the other, have also been extensively studied.

Quantum Monte Carlo methods have been used to calculate the binding energies of AA- and AB-stacked bilayer graphene, which are 11.5(9) and 17.7(9) meV per atom, respectively. This is consistent with the observation that the AB-stacked structure is more stable than the AA-stacked structure.

== Synthesis ==
Bilayer graphene can be made by exfoliation from graphite or by chemical vapor deposition (CVD). In 2016 Rodney S. Ruoff and colleagues showed that large single-crystal bilayer graphene could be produced by oxygen-activated chemical vapour deposition. Later in the same year a Korean group reported the synthesis of wafer-scale single-crystal AB-stacked bilayer graphene

== Tunable bandgap ==
Like monolayer graphene, bilayer graphene has a zero bandgap and thus behaves like a semimetal. In 2007 researchers predicted that a bandgap could be introduced if an electric displacement field were applied to the two layers: a so-called tunable band gap. An experimental demonstration of a tunable bandgap in bilayer graphene came in 2009. In 2015 researchers observed 1D ballistic electron conducting channels at bilayer graphene domain walls. Another group showed that the band gap of bilayer films on silicon carbide could be controlled by selectively adjusting the carrier concentration.

== Emergent complex states ==
In 2014 researchers described the emergence of complex electronic states in bilayer graphene, notably the fractional quantum Hall effect and showed that this could be tuned by an electric field. In 2017 the observation of an even-denominator fractional quantum Hall state was reported in bilayer graphene.

== Excitonic Condensation ==
Bilayer graphene showed the potential to realize a Bose–Einstein condensate of excitons. Electrons and holes are fermions, but when they form an exciton, they become bosons, allowing Bose-Einstein condensation to occur. Exciton condensates in bilayer systems have been shown theoretically to carry a supercurrent.

== Superconductivity in twisted bilayer graphene ==
Pablo Jarillo-Herrero of MIT and colleagues from Harvard and the National Institute for Materials Science, Tsukuba, Japan, have reported the discovery of superconductivity in bilayer graphene with a twist angle of 1.1° between the two layers. The discovery was announced in Nature in March 2018. The findings confirmed predictions made in 2011 by Allan MacDonald and Rafi Bistritzer that the amount of energy a free electron would require to tunnel between two graphene sheets radically changes at this angle. The graphene bilayer was prepared from exfoliated monolayers of graphene, with the second layer being manually rotated to a set angle with respect to the first layer. A critical temperature of $T_c = 1.7 K$ was observed with such specimens in the original paper (with newer papers reporting slightly higher temperatures).

The study of such lattices has been dubbed "twistronics" and was inspired by earlier theoretical treatments of layered assemblies of graphene.

== Field-effect transistors ==
Bilayer graphene can be used to construct field-effect transistors or tunneling field effect transistors, exploiting the small energy gap. However, the energy gap is smaller than 250 meV and therefore requires the use of low operating voltage (< 250 mV), which is too small to obtain reasonable performance for a field effect transistor, but is very suited to the operation of tunnel field effect transistors, which according to theory from a paper in 2009 can operate with an operating voltage of only 100 mV.

In 2016 researchers proposed the use of bilayer graphene to increase the output voltage of tunnel transistors (TT). They operate at a lower operating voltage range (150 mV) than silicon transistors (500 mV). Bilayer graphene's energy band is unlike that of most semiconductors in that the electrons around the edges form a (high density) van Hove singularity. This supplies sufficient electrons to increase current flow across the energy barrier. Bilayer graphene transistors use "electrical" rather than "chemical" doping.

== Ultrafast lithium diffusion ==
In 2017 an international group of researchers showed that bilayer graphene could act as a single-phase mixed conductor which exhibited Li diffusion faster than in graphite by an order of magnitude. In combination with the fast electronic conduction of graphene sheets, this system offers both ionic and electronic conductivity within the same single-phase solid material. This has important implications for energy storage devices such as lithium ion batteries.

== Ultrahard carbon from epitaxial bilayer graphene ==
Researchers from the City University of New York have shown that sheets of bilayer graphene on silicon carbide temporarily become harder than diamond upon impact with the tip of an atomic force microscope. This was attributed to a graphite-diamond transition, and the behavior appeared to be unique to bilayer graphene. This could have applications in personal armor.

== Porous nanoflakes ==
Hybridization processes change the intrinsic properties of graphene and/or induce poor interfaces. In 2014 a general route to obtain unstacked graphene via facile, templated, catalytic growth was announced. The resulting material has a specific surface area of 1628 m2 g-1, is electrically conductive and has a mesoporous structure.

The material is made with a mesoporous nanoflake template. Graphene layers are deposited onto the template. The carbon atoms accumulate in the mesopores, forming protuberances that act as spacers to prevent stacking. The protuberance density is approximately 5.8×10^{14} m^{−2}. Graphene is deposited on both sides of the flakes.

During CVD synthesis the protuberances produce intrinsically unstacked double-layer graphene after the removal of the nanoflakes. The presence of such protuberances on the surface can weaken the π-π interactions between graphene layers and thus reduce stacking. The bilayer graphene shows a specific surface area of 1628 m^{2}/g, a pore size ranging from 2 to 7 nm and a total pore volume of 2.0 cm^{3}/g.

Using bilayer graphene as cathode material for a lithium–sulfur battery yielded reversible capacities of 1034 and 734 mAh/g at discharge rates of 5 and 10 C, respectively. After 1000 cycles reversible capacities of some 530 and 380 mAh/g were retained at 5 and 10 C, with coulombic efficiency constants at 96 and 98%, respectively.

Electrical conductivity of 438 S/cm was obtained. Even after the infiltration of sulfur, electrical conductivity of 107 S cm/1 was retained. The graphene's unique porous structure allowed the effective storage of sulfur in the interlayer space, which gives rise to an efficient connection between the sulfur and graphene and prevents the diffusion of polysulfides into the electrolyte.

== Characterization ==
Hyperspectral global Raman imaging is an accurate and rapid technique to spatially characterize product quality. The vibrational modes of a system characterize it, providing information on stoichiometry, composition, morphology, stress and number of layers. Monitoring graphene's G and D peaks (around 1580 and 1360 cm^{−1}) intensity gives direct information on the number of layers of the sample.

It has been shown that the two graphene layers can withstand important strain or doping mismatch which ultimately should lead to their exfoliation.

Quantitative determination of bilayer graphene's structural parameters---such as surface roughness, inter- and intralayer spacings, stacking order, and interlayer twist---is obtainable using 3D electron diffraction
