= Heterostrain =

Materials science term

The term heterostrain was proposed in 2018 in the context of materials science to simplify the designation of possible strain situations in van der Waals heterostructures where two (or more) two-dimensional materials are stacked on top of each other. These layers can experience the same deformation (homostrain) or different deformations (heterostrain). In addition to twist, heterostrain can have important consequences on the electronic and optical properties of the resulting structure. As such, the control of heterostrain is emerging as a sub-field of straintronics in which the properties of 2D materials are controlled by strain. Recent works have reported a deterministic control of heterostrain by sample processing or with the tip of an AFM of particular interest in twisted heterostructures. Heterostrain alone (without twist) has also been identified as a parameter to tune the electronic properties of van der Waals structures as for example in twisted graphene layers with biaxial heterostrain.

== Etymology ==
Heterostrain is constructed from the Greek prefix hetero- (different) and the noun strain. It means that the two layers constituting the structure are subject to different strains. This is in contrast with homostrain in which the two layers as subject to the same strain. Heterostrain is designated as "relative strain" by some authors.

== Manifestation and measurement of heterostrain ==
For simplicity, the case of two graphene layers is considered. The description can be generalized for the case of different 2D materials forming an heterostructure.

In nature, the two graphene layers usually stack with a shift of half a unit cell. This configuration is the most energetically favorable and is found in graphite. If one layer is strained while the other is left intact, a moiré pattern signaling the regions where the atomic lattices of the two layers are in or out of registry. The shape of the moiré pattern depends on the type of strain.

- If the layer is deformed along one direction (uniaxial heterostrain), the moiré is one dimensional.
- If the layer is strained in the same way along two directions (biaxial heterostrain), the moiré is a two-dimensional superstructure.

Graphene layers in Bernal stacking

Graphene layers with biaxial heterostrain

Graphene layers with uniaxial heterostrain

In General, a layer can be deformed by an arbitrary combination of both types of heterostrain.

Heterostrain can be measured by scanning tunneling microscope which provides images showing both the atomic lattice of the first layer and the moiré superlattice. Relating the atomic lattice to the moiré lattice allows to determine entirely the relative arrangement of the layers (biaxial, uniaxial heterostrain and twist). The method is immune to calibration artifacts which affect the image of the two layers identically which cancels out in the relative measurement. Alternatively, with a well calibrated microscope and if biaxial heterostrain is low enough, it is possible to determine twist and uniaxial heterostrain from the knowledge of the moiré period in all directions. On the contrary it is much more difficult to determine homostrain which necessitates a calibration sample.

== Origin and impact of heterostrain ==
Heterostrain is generated during the fabrication of the 2D materials stack. It can result from a meta-stable configuration during bottom up assembly or from the layer manipulation in the tear and stack technique. It has been shown to be ubiquitous in twisted graphene layers near the magic twist angle and to be the main factor in the flat band width of those systems. Heterostrain has a much larger impact on electronic properties than homostrain. It explains some of the sample variability which had previously been puzzeling. Research is now moving towards understanding the impact of spatial fluctuations of heterostrain.
