= Steven Ray Hall =

American academic

Steven R. Hall
- Born: July 6, 1959 (age 67); West Palm Beach, Florida
- Education: MIT (S.B. 1980, S.M. 1982, Sc.D. 1985)
- Scientific career
- Fields: Aeronautics and Astronautics
- Workplaces: Massachusetts Institute of Technology
- Thesis: A failure detection algorithm for linear dynamic systems (1985)
- Doctoral advisor: Wallace E. Vander Velde, Bruce K. Walker and John J. Deyst.

Steven Ray Hall (born July 6, 1959 in West Palm Beach, Florida) is the Chair of the Faculty and Professor of Aeronautics and Astronautics at the Massachusetts Institute of Technology, in Cambridge, Massachusetts.

His research interests are in aerospace controls systems, including flexible space structure control, control of noise and vibration, especially in helicopters, and the development of smart material actuators. He is the coauthor of seven patents, mostly in the area of smart material actuation. His teaching includes graduate and undergraduate subjects in signals and systems, control theory, guidance and navigation, and flight mechanics and control.

Hall was the lead instructor for the Unified Engineering course freely available through MIT OpenCourseWare.

== Personal life ==
Steven Ray Hall grew up in Florida, living in a half dozen towns throughout the central part of the state before graduating from high school in St. Petersburg, Florida. Living in Florida at the height of the space race, he developed an interest in aircraft and rockets early in life.

Since 2008, he has been the Associate Housemaster of Simmons Hall, where he runs the Simmons Hall Residential Scholar program. He lives with the Simmons Hall community of students and scholars, which he describes as “warm, welcoming, and vibrant.” His daughter, Caitlin, lives with him at Simmons Hall and is a graduate student at Emerson College. His son, Michael, lives in nearby Watertown, Massachusetts. He is a certificated pilot, and owner of a Cessna Cutlass RG, which he flies on weekends and vacations.

== University positions ==
- Chair of the Faculty, 2013–present
- Associate Professor, 1991 – present
- Assistant Department Head, 1997-1998
- Assistant Professor, 1985-1991

== Honors and awards ==
- MacVicar Faculty Fellow, 2002
- Raymond L. Bisplinghoff Fellow, 1998
- Hertz Fellow, 1983-1985
- Member, Tau Beta Pi

== Society memberships ==
- Associate Fellow, American Institute of Aeronautics and Astronautics
- Member, Institute of Electrical and Electronics Engineers
- Member, American Helicopter Society
- Member, American Society for Engineering Education
