= Craig Fennie =

American materials scientist (1971–2026)

- Born: November 6, 1971
- Died: June 14, 2026 (aged 54)
- Citizenship: United States
- Education: B.E.E. (1993), and M.S.E.E. (1996), Villanova University, Ph.D. in Physics Rutgers (2006)
- Awards: Fellow of the American Physical Society (2015), MacArthur Fellowship (2013), PECASE (2012)
- Scientific career
- Fields: Materials Science, Condensed matter physics
- Workplaces: Cornell University
- Thesis: Understanding the interplay of lattice and magnetic degrees of freedom in structurally complex insulators from first principles (2006)
- Doctoral advisor: Karin M. Rabe

Craig J. Fennie (Irish: Craig Séamus Óg Ó Fiannaidhe; November 6, 1971 – June 14, 2026) was an American scientist. He was a professor at the School of Applied and Engineering Physics at Cornell University in Ithaca, New York. Fennie was a physicist and materials scientist. He is best known for winning a MacArthur Award in 2013.

== Early life ==
Craig Óg grew up in working-class neighborhoods of Philadelphia (Olney and NE) and attended Archdiocese primary (Incarnation of our Lord, known as "Inky") and high school (Archbishop Ryan High School). He took nearly a decade off before going to graduate school. During this time he was in an Irish-American punk band and worked several jobs including being a bouncer.

His family came from Tír Eoghain, Tuaisceart Éireann, near Loch Neagh. His father (Craig Mór) was a steamfitter, originally from Lackawanna, NY. His mother is from Minersville, PA.

== Work ==
Fennie's work combined elements of physics and chemistry in order to invent new materials with desirable properties.

== Death ==
Fennie died of a heart attack on June 14, 2026, at the age of 54.
