= Twistronics =

Electrical behaviour of layered materials

Atomic scale moiré pattern created by overlapping two skewed sheets of graphene, a hexagonal lattice composed of carbon atoms.

Twistronics (from twist and electronics) is the study of how the angle (the twist) between layers of two-dimensional materials can change their electrical properties. Materials such as bilayer graphene have been shown to have vastly different electronic behavior, ranging from non-conductive to superconductive, that depends sensitively on the angle between the layers. The term was first introduced by the research group of Efthimios Kaxiras at Harvard University in their theoretical treatment of graphene superlattices.

Pablo Jarillo-Herrero, Allan H. MacDonald and Rafi Bistritzer were awarded the 2020 Wolf Prize in Physics for their theoretical and experimental work on twisted bilayer graphene.

== History ==
In 2007, National University of Singapore physicist Antonio H. Castro Neto hypothesized that pressing two misaligned graphene sheets together might yield new electrical properties, and separately proposed that graphene might offer a route to superconductivity, but he did not combine the two ideas. In 2010 researchers in Eva Andrei's laboratory at Rutgers University in Piscataway, New Jersey, discovered twisted bilayer graphene through its defining moiré pattern and demonstrating that the twist angle has a strong effect on the band structure by measuring greatly renormalized van Hove singularities. Also in 2010 researchers from Federico Santa María Technical University in Chile found that for a certain angle close to 1 degree the band of the electronic structure of twisted bilayer graphene became completely flat, and because of that theoretical property, they suggested that collective behavior might be possible. In 2011 Allan H. MacDonald (of University of Texas at Austin) and Rafi Bistritzer using a simple theoretical model found that for the previously found "magic angle" the amount of energy a free electron would require to tunnel between two graphene sheets radically changes. In 2017, the research group of Efthimios Kaxiras at Harvard University used detailed quantum mechanics calculations to reduce uncertainty in the twist angle between two graphene layers that can induce extraordinary behavior of electrons in this two-dimensional system. In 2018, Pablo Jarillo-Herrero, an experimentalist at Massachusetts Institute of Technology, found that the magic angle resulted in the unusual electrical properties that MacDonald and Bistritzer had predicted. At 1.1 degrees rotation at sufficiently low temperatures, electrons move from one layer to the other, creating a lattice and the phenomenon of superconductivity.

Publication of these discoveries has generated a host of theoretical papers seeking to understand and explain the phenomena as well as numerous experiments using varying numbers of layers, twist angles and other materials. Subsequent works showed that electronic properties of the stack can also be strongly dependent on heterostrain especially near the magic angle allowing potential applications in straintronics.

== Characteristics ==
A twistronics animation. Here, we have 2 overlaid sheets, one of which rotates a total of 90 degrees. We see that as the angle of rotation changes, so does the periodicity.

=== Superconduction and insulation ===
The theoretical predictions of superconductivity were confirmed by Pablo Jarillo-Herrero and his student Yuan Cao of MIT and colleagues from Harvard University and the National Institute for Materials Science in Tsukuba, Japan. In 2018 they verified that superconductivity existed in bilayer graphene where one layer was rotated by an angle of 1.1° relative to the other, forming a moiré pattern, at a temperature of 1.7 K (−271.45 °C; −456.61 °F). They created two bilayer devices that acted as an insulator instead of a conductor without a magnetic field. Increasing the field strength turned the second device into a superconductor.

A further advance in twistronics is the discovery of a method of turning the superconductive paths on and off by application of a small voltage differential.

=== Heterostructures ===
Experiments have also been done using combinations of graphene layers with other materials that form heterostructures in the form of atomically thin sheets that are held together by the weak Van der Waals force. For example, a study published in Science in July 2019 found that with the addition of a boron nitride lattice between two graphene sheets, unique orbital ferromagnetic effects were produced at a 1.17° angle, which could be used to implement memory in quantum computers. Further spectroscopic studies of twisted bilayer graphene revealed strong electron-electron correlations at the magic angle.

=== Electron puddling ===
Between 2-D layers for bismuth selenide and a dichalcogenide, researchers at the Northeastern University in Boston, discovered that at a specific degrees of twist a new lattice layer, consisting of only pure electrons, would develop between the two 2-D elemental layers. The quantum and physical effects of the alignment between the two layers appears to create "puddle" regions which trap electrons into a stable lattice. Because this stable lattice consists only of electrons, it is the first non-atomic lattice observed and suggests new opportunities to confine, control, measure, and transport electrons.

=== Ferromagnetism ===
A three layer construction, consisting of two layers of graphene with a 2-D layer of boron nitride, has been shown to exhibit superconductivity, insulation and ferromagnetism. In 2021, this was achieved on a single graphene flake.

== See also ==
- Spintronics – the study of the intrinsic spin of the electron and its associated magnetic moment in solid-state devices
- Straintronics – a method for altering the properties of two-dimensional materials by introducing controlled stress
- Valleytronics – the study of local extrema, valleys, in the electronic band structure of semiconductors
