= David Vanderbilt =

American physicist (born 1954)

- Born: 20 August 1954 (age 72); Huntington, New York, U.S.
- Education: Swarthmore College (BA); Massachusetts Institute of Technology (PhD)
- Scientific career
- Fields: Physics
- Workplaces: Rutgers University
- Doctoral students: Nicola Marzari

David Vanderbilt is an American physicist. He is a professor of physics at Rutgers University researching condensed-matter physics since 1991, and named Board of Governors Professor of Physics in 2009. He received his B.A. from Swarthmore College in 1976 and his Ph.D. from MIT in 1981 studying under John D. Joannopoulos. He received the Aneesur Rahman Prize for Computational Physics in 2006. The Aneesur Rahman prize is the highest honor given by the American Physical Society for work in computational physics. In 2013 he was elected to the National Academy of Science.
