= Rafi Bistritzer =

Israeli physicist

- רפי ביסטריצר
- Born: 1974 (age 51–52); Israel
- Education: Tel Aviv University
- Alma mater: Weizmann Institute of Science
- Occupation: Physicist
- Years active: 2000–present

Rafi Bistritzer (Hebrew: רפי ביסטריצר; born 1974 in Israel) is an Israeli physicist, and manager of an algorithms group at Applied Materials. He is the winner of the 2020 Wolf Prize in Physics, together with Pablo Jarillo-Herrero and Allan MacDonald, for "pioneering theoretical and experimental work on twisted bilayer graphene."

== Education ==
Bistritzer received a bachelor's degree in physics from Tel Aviv University in 2000. He received an MSc in physics in 2003, and a PhD in physics in 2007, both from the Weizmann Institute of Science. He moved to the United States for a postdoctoral fellowship at the University of Texas at Austin, under the supervision of Alan H. MacDonald, where he studied the theoretical physics of bilayer graphene, and specifically twisted bilayer graphene. Their calculations predicted that two parallel graphene sheets twisted at an angle of 1.1 degrees relative to each other (an angle known as the "magic angle") would host flat moiré bands and thus possibly correlated states.

== Career ==
MacDonald's and Bistritzer's work served as the basis for later experimental research by Pablo Jarillo-Herrero at MIT, whose group validated the correctness of the calculations in 2018. The result was a breakthrough in the field of twistronics. For their work, Bistritzer, MacDonald, and Jarillo-Herrero were jointly awarded the 2020 Wolf Prize in physics.

In March 2011 Bistritzer returned to Israel and joined Aspect Imaging, where he worked as a physicist and led a research and development rheology team. In 2013 he moved to Medtronic as the manager of the physics group. Since December 2015, he has been working at Applied Materials as the director of an algorithms group that focuses on computer vision and machine learning. In 2020 he was appointed as an associate professor in Tel Aviv University.

Bistritzer currently lives in Petah Tikva, Israel.
