= Straintronics =

Area of materials science

Straintronics (from strain and electronics) is the study of how folds and mechanically induced stresses in a layer of two-dimensional materials can change their electrical properties. It is distinct from twistronics in that the latter involves changes in the angle between two layers of 2D material. However, in such multi-layers if strain is applied to only one layers, which is called heterostrain, strain can have similar effect as twist in changing electronic properties. It is also distinct from, but similar to, the piezoelectric effects which are created by bending, twisting, or squeezing of certain material.
