= John Joannopoulos =

American physicist (1947–2025)

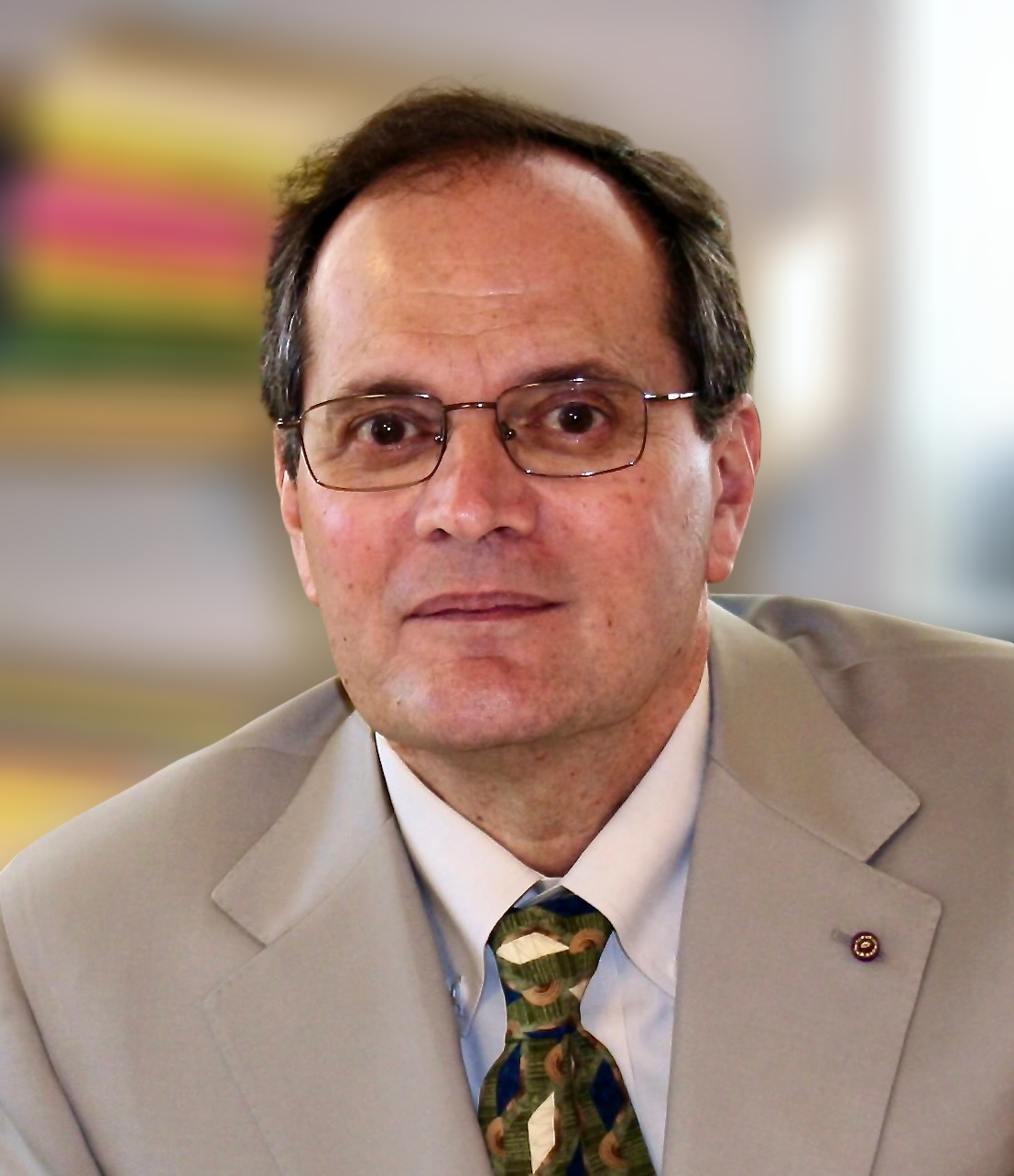
- Joannopoulos in 2010
- Born: April 26, 1947; New York City, U.S.
- Died: August 17, 2025 (aged 78)
- Education: University of California, Berkeley
- Scientific career
- Fields: Physics
- Workplaces: MIT
- Thesis: Electronic structure of complex crystalline and amorphous semiconductors (1974)
- Doctoral advisor: Marvin L. Cohen
- Doctoral students: Eugene J. Mele (1978); Robert B. Laughlin (1979); David Vanderbilt (1981); A. Douglas Stone (1982); Yaneer Bar-Yam (1984); Efthimios Kaxiras (1987); Karin M. Rabe (1987); Andrew M. Rappe (1992); Shanhui Fan (1997); Steven G. Johnson (2001); Michelle Povinelli (2004); Maria Chan (2009)

John D. Joannopoulos (April 26, 1947 – August 17, 2025) was an American physicist, focused in condensed matter theory. He was the Francis Wright Davis Professor of Physics at Massachusetts Institute of Technology, an Elected Member of the National Academy of Sciences (NAS), an Elected Member of the American Academy of Arts and Sciences (AAA&S), and an Elected Fellow of the American Association for the Advancement of Science (AAAS) and American Physical Society (APS).

== Life and career ==
Joannopoulos was born on April 26, 1947, in New York City to Greek parents. He is the recipient of numerous awards and honors. Most recently, in 2015, the Optical Society of America (OSA) awarded him the Max Born Award and the APS awarded him the Aneesur Rahman Prize for Computational Physics, both significant awards.

Joannopoulos was appointed director of the Institute for Soldier Nanotechnologies in 2006, and was a Principal Investigator at the Research Laboratory of Electronics.

Joannopoulos had been on the MIT faculty since 1974. He held his BA and PhD from the University of California, Berkeley, the latter received in 1974. His doctoral studies, advised by Marvin L. Cohen, focused on electronic structure of complex crystalline and amorphous semiconductors.

Joannopoulos had helped set the theoretical foundations of key computational techniques for realistic and microscopic studies of complex materials systems, including the electronic, vibrational, and optical structure of crystalline and amorphous solids, their surfaces, interfaces, and defects; localization in disordered systems; and the first ab-initio studies of phase transitions and critical phenomena. In the early nineties, he also helped spawn the development of a new class of materials (photonic crystals) that provide new mechanisms to control the flow of light and have revolutionized the fields of optical and lightwave physics.

His former students include Nobel Laureate Robert B. Laughlin, along with professors Yaneer Bar-Yam, Shanhui Fan, Steven G. Johnson, Eugene J. Mele, Michelle Povinelli, Karin M. Rabe, David Vanderbilt, and many other faculty at major universities.

Joannopoulos died on August 17, 2025, at the age of 78.

== See also ==
- Leslie Kolodziejski, fellow MIT physicist and collaborator of Joannopoulos
