= Shanhui Fan =

American academic (born 1972)

- 范汕洄
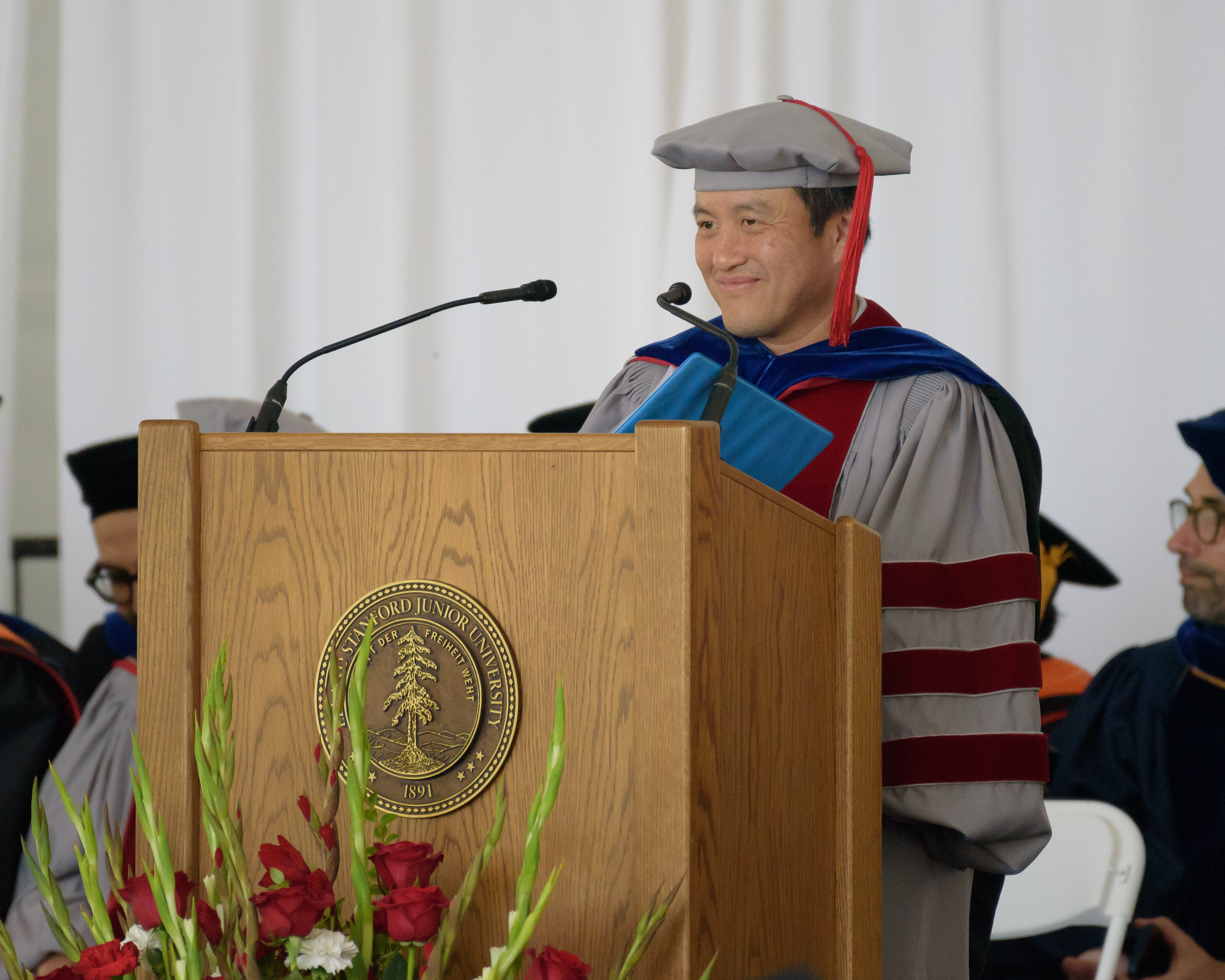
- Born: 1972 (age 53–54); Zhengzhou, China
- Education: Massachusetts Institute of Technology; University of Science and Technology of China
- Known for: daytime radiative cooling, photonics, solar cells
- Awards: Vannevar Bush Fellow (2017)
- Scientific career
- Fields: Nanophotonics, Photonic Crystals, Metamaterials, Topological physics, Plasmonics, Solar Cells
- Doctoral advisor: John D. Joannopoulos (MIT)

Shanhui Fan (Chinese: 范汕洄; born 1972) is a Chinese-born American electrical engineer and physicist, with a focus on theoretical, computational and numerical aspects of photonics and electromagnetism. He is a professor of electrical engineering, and a professor of applied physics (by courtesy) at Stanford University. He is the director of the Edward L. Ginzton Lab and Senior Fellow at the Precourt Institute for Energy.

== Education ==
Fan did his undergraduate study in physics from the University of Science and Technology of China from 1988 to 1992. He completed his PhD in Electrical Engineering from Massachusetts Institute of Technology (MIT) in 1997, after which he continued as a postdoctoral researcher in the same group at MIT. His advisor was John D. Joannopoulos.

== Career ==
Fan joined Stanford's faculty of electrical engineering in April 2001.

In 2012, he was a visiting professor of physics at University of Sydney.

Since 2014, Fan has been the Director of the Edward L. Ginzton Lab. He was appointed Senior Fellow at the Precourt Institute for Energy and courtesy professor of Applied Physics through January 31, 2021.

Fan's research areas include nanophotonics, photonic crystals, metamaterials, topological photonics, plasmonics, solar cells.

As of 2019, Fan has been granted approximately 57 patents.

== Selected works ==
- Coupled Mode Theory For Optical Resonances:
  - Shanhui Fan; Wonjoo Suh; J.D. Joannopoulos (2003). "Temporal coupled mode theory for Fano resonances in optical resonators". Journal of the Optical Society of America. 20 (3): 569–572. doi:10.1364/JOSAA.20.000569. PMID 12630843.
  - Z. Yu; A. Raman; S. Fan (2010). "Fundamental limit of nanophotonic light trapping in solar cells". Proceedings of the National Academy of Sciences. 107 (41): 17491–17496. arXiv:1004.2902. Bibcode:2010PNAS..10717491Y. doi:10.1073/pnas.1008296107. PMC 2955111. PMID 20876131.
- Modulation Induced Non-Reciprocity:
  - Z. Yu; S. Fan (2009). "Complete optical isolation created by indirect interband photonic transition". Nature Photonics. 3 (2): 91–94. Bibcode:2009NaPho...3...91Y. doi:10.1038/nphoton.2008.273.
  - K. Fang; Z. Yu; S. Fan (2012). "Realizing effective magnetic field for photons by controlling the phase of dynamic modulation". Nature Photonics. 6 (11): 782–787. Bibcode:2012NaPho...6..782F. doi:10.1038/nphoton.2012.236. S2CID 33927607.
- Daytime Radiative Cooling:
  - A. Raman; M. A. Anoma; L. Zhu; E. Rephaeli; S. Fan (2014). "Passive radiative cooling below ambient air temperature under direct sunlight". Nature. 515 (7528): 540–544. Bibcode:2014Natur.515..540R. doi:10.1038/nature13883. PMID 25428501. S2CID 4382732.
  - Fan, Shanhui; Li, Wei (March 2022). "Photonics and thermodynamics concepts in radiative cooling". Nature Photonics. 16 (3): 182–190. Bibcode:2022NaPho..16..182F. doi:10.1038/s41566-021-00921-9. S2CID 246668570.

== Awards and honors ==
- R. W. Wood Prize, Optica (2022), "For foundational discoveries in photonics, ranging from resonator, topological, and non-reciprocal photonics to energy applications including the discovery of daytime radiative cooling based on a new kind of energy source."
- Vannevar Bush Faculty Fellowship (2017)
- Thomson Reuters Highly Cited Researcher in Physics (2015–)
- Fellow, IEEE (2010), for “contributions to nanophotonics”.
- Fellow, SPIE (2010)
- Fellow, the American Physical Society (2008), for “contributions to the theory and applications of nanophotonic structures and devices, including photonic crystals, plasmonics and meta-materials.
- Fellow, the Optical Society of America (2008), “For many deep and creative contributions to physics, analysis, and novel devices in semiconductor, dielectric and metallic optical nanostructures”.
- The Adolph Lomb Medal from the Optical Society of America (2007), “For fundamental work in nano-photonic structures”.
- The William O. Baker Award for Initiatives in Research (previously the NAS Award for Initiatives in Research) (2007), “For innovative research on the theory and applications of photonic crystal devices”.
- David and Lucile Packard Foundation Fellowship for Science and Engineering (2003)
- National Science Foundation Faculty Early Career Development Award (2002)
