= International Journal of High Performance Computing Applications =

- Discipline: Computer science
- Language: English
- Edited by: Joanne Martin

Publication details
- Former names: International Journal of Supercomputer Applications and High-Performance Computing, International Journal of Supercomputer Applications
- History: 1987-present
- Publisher: SAGE Publications
- Frequency: Quarterly
- Impact factor: 3.1 (2022)

Standard abbreviations
- ISO 4: Int. J. High Perform. Comput. Appl.

Indexing
- CODEN: IHPCFL
- ISSN: 1094-3420 (print); 1741-2846 (web)
- LCCN: 98657707
- OCLC no.: 40095711

Links
- Journal homepage; Online access; Online archive

The International Journal of High Performance Computing Applications is a quarterly peer-reviewed scientific journal covering the field of computer science. Its editors-in-chief are Jack J. Dongarra (University of Tennessee) and Bronis R. De Supinski (Lawrence Livermore National Laboratory). It was established in 1987 and is published by SAGE Publications.

== Abstracting and indexing ==
The journal is abstracted and indexed in Academic Search Premier, Mechanical & Transportation Engineering Abstracts, Current Contents, Scopus, and the Science Citation Index Expanded. According to the Journal Citation Reports, its 2022 impact factor is 3.1.
