= Karin M. Rabe =

American condensed matter physicist (born 1961)

Karin Maria Rabe (born April 1, 1961) is an American condensed matter and computational materials physicist known for her studies of materials near phase transitions, including ferroelectrics, multiferroics, and martensites. She also works on the theoretical design of new materials. She is a distinguished professor and Board of Governors Professor of Physics at Rutgers University.

== Education and career ==
Rabe was born in New York City and attended the Bronx High School of Science. She graduated magna cum laude from Princeton University in 1982, with a bachelor's degree in physics. She completed her Ph.D. in 1987 at the Massachusetts Institute of Technology; her dissertation Ab initio Statistical Mechanics of Structural Phase Transitions was supervised by John Joannopoulos.

After postdoctoral research at AT&T Bell Laboratories, she joined Yale University as Clare Boothe Luce Assistant Professor of Applied Physics and Physics in 1989. She became full professor at Yale in 1999, and moved to Rutgers in 2000. At Rutgers, her doctoral students have included 2013 MacArthur "Genius" Award winner Craig Fennie.

Rabe also served as chair of the board of the Aspen Center for Physics from 2018 to 2021, as president from 2013 to 2016, and as vice president from 2007 to 2013.

== Recognition ==
Rabe was named Board of Governors Professor by Rutgers in 2013.

In 2002, she was elected as a Fellow of the American Physical Society (APS), after a nomination from the APS Division of Materials Physics "for fundamental contributions to the development and application of theoretical and computational methods for the study of structural phase transitions in solids". Rabe won the David Adler Lectureship Award in the Field of Materials Physics for 2008 "for research, writings and presentations on the theory of structural phase transitions and for the application of first-principles electronic structure methods to the understanding of technologically important phenomena in ferroelectrics".

She was named a Fellow of the American Association for the Advancement of Science in 2011, and elected to both the American Academy of Arts and Sciences and the National Academy of Sciences in 2013.

== Research ==
Rabe’s research has focused on the computational analysis of the physics of crystalline solids using first-principles. She has examined material systems which are close to structural, electronic, and magnetic phase transitions. Such systems include ferroelectrics, antiferroelectrics, piezoelectrics, high-k dielectrics, multiferroics, shape-memory compounds, magnetic and nonmagnetic martensites. These materials exhibit properties which support a wide range of technological applications, including information and energy storage and conversion.

Rabe’s research has also examined the effects of epitaxial strain and the properties of interfaces in thin films, superlattices, and other artificially structured systems.

Finally, Rabe has applied first-principles approaches to theoretically design new materials with optimized or useful properties, as well as to discover new classes of functional materials.
