= Pablo Jarillo-Herrero =

Spanish physicist

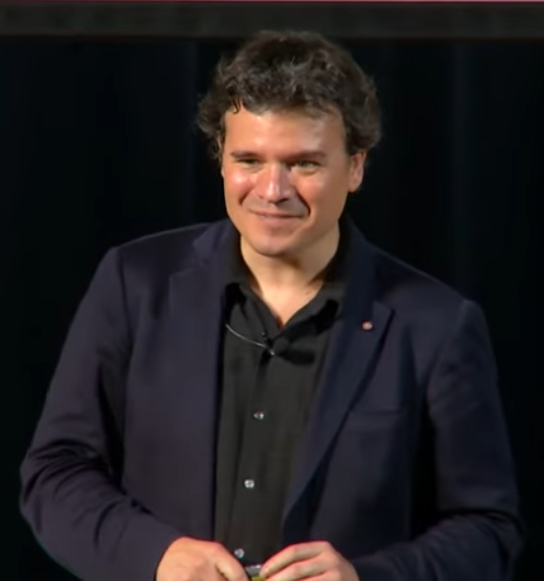
- Giving the lecture "Magic Angle Graphene" at UC Berkeley in 2024
- Born: June 11, 1976 (age 50); Valencia, Spain
- Education: University of Valencia BSc; University of California, San Diego MS; Delft University of Technology PhD
- Awards: Oliver E. Buckley Condensed Matter Prize (2020); Wolf Prize in Physics (2020); Lise Meitner Distinguished Lecture (2021); BBVA Foundation Frontiers of Knowledge Award (2025)
- Scientific career
- Fields: Physicist
- Workplaces: Cecil and Ida Green Professor of Physics at MIT
- Thesis: Quantum transport in carbon nanotubes (2005)
- Doctoral advisor: Leo Kouwenhoven

Pablo Jarillo-Herrero (born June 11, 1976) is a Spanish physicist and current Cecil and Ida Green Professor of Physics at Massachusetts Institute of Technology (MIT).

== Biography ==
Jarillo-Herrero was born in Valencia, Spain. In 1999 he received his Licenciatura in physics from the University of Valencia. Then he spent two years at the University of California, San Diego, where he received a MSc in 2001. In 2005 at the Delft University of Technology in The Netherlands he earned his PhD, and continued on to a postdoc. In 2006 he moved to Columbia University, where he worked as a NanoResearch Initiative Fellow. In January 2008 he joined MIT as an assistant professor of physics and received tenure. In 2018 he was promoted to Full Professor of Physics.

In 2018 Jarillo-Herrero presented a new 2D-platform to investigate strongly correlated physics, based on graphene moiré superlattices. When two graphene sheets are twisted by an angle close to a "magic angle" theoretically predicted by Allan MacDonald and Rafi Bistritzer, the resulting flat band structure near the Dirac point gives rise to a strongly-correlated electronic system. His research demonstrated electrically tunable superconductivity in this system of pure carbon and without an applied magnetic field.

== Honors ==
- Highly Cited Researcher by Clarivate Analytics-Web of Science (2017–2022)
- APS Fellow (2018)
- Fellow of the Quantum Materials Program of the Canadian Institute for Advanced Research (2019)
- Member at Large of the APS Division of Condensed Matter Physics (2019)
- Pimentel Lecturer, University of California Berkeley (2021)
- Dresselhaus Lecturer, MIT (2022)
- Elected Foreign Member of the US National Academy of Sciences (2022)
- Ford Lecturer, University of Michigan Ann Arbor (2022)
- Hanna Visiting Professor, Stanford University (2022)
- Max Planck Lecturer, Max Planck Institute for Solid State Research (2022)
- APS Kavli Foundation Symposium Speaker, Las Vegas (2023)
- Cherwell-Simons Lecturer, University of Oxford (2023)
- Elected Foreign Member of the Spanish Royal Academy of Sciences (2023)

== Prizes and awards ==
- 2006 Spanish Royal Society Young Investigator Award (2006)
- 2008 Alfred P. Sloan Fellowship
- 2008 NSF Career Award
- 2009 David and Lucile Packard Fellowship
- 2010 IUPAP Young Scientist Prize in Semiconductor Physics
- 2011 DOE Early Career Award
- 2021 NIMS Award, National Institute for Materials Science, Japan
- 2012 Presidential Early Career Award for Scientists and Engineers (PECASE)
- 2013 ONR Young Investigator Award
- 2014 Moore Foundation Investigator in Quantum Materials Award
- 2018 Breakthrough of the Year Award winner by Physics World
- 2020 APS Oliver E. Buckley Condensed Matter Physics Prize
- 2020 Medal of the Spanish Royal Physics Society
- 2020 Moore Foundation Investigator in Quantum Materials Award
- 2020 Wolf Prize in Physics
- 2021 Lise Meitner Distinguished Lecture and Medal, Lise Meitner Distinguished Lecture
- 2021 Max Planck Humboldt Research Award, Germany
- 2021 US National Academy of Sciences Award for Scientific Discovery
- 2022 Dan Maydan Prize in Nanoscience Research, Israel
- 2023 Alumni-Plus Insigne Prize, Univ. of Valencia.
- 2023 Ramon y Cajal Medal, Spanish Royal Academy of Sciences
- 2023 Richard E. Prange Prize and Lectureship, Univ. of Maryland
- 2025 BBVA Foundation Frontiers of Knowledge Award in the category "Basic Sciences".
- 2026 Kavli Prize in the category of "Nanoscience".

== Works ==
- Jarillo-Herrero, Pablo; Kong, Jing; van der Zant, Herre S.J.; Dekker, Cees; Kouwenhoven, Leo P.; De Franceschi, Silvano (2005). "Orbital Kondo effect in carbon nanotubes". Nature. 434 (7032). Springer Science and Business Media LLC: 484–488. arXiv:cond-mat/0504059. Bibcode:2005Natur.434..484J. doi:10.1038/nature03422. ISSN 0028-0836. PMID 15791250. S2CID 4383295.
- Jarillo-Herrero, Pablo; van Dam, Jorden A.; Kouwenhoven, Leo P. (2006). "Quantum supercurrent transistors in carbon nanotubes". Nature. 439 (7079). Springer Science and Business Media LLC: 953–956. arXiv:cond-mat/0601434. Bibcode:2006Natur.439..953J. doi:10.1038/nature04550. ISSN 0028-0836. PMID 16495994. S2CID 1927615.
- Özyilmaz, Barbaros; Jarillo-Herrero, Pablo; Efetov, Dmitri; Abanin, Dmitry A.; Levitov, Leonid S.; Kim, Philip (October 17, 2007). "Electronic Transport and Quantum Hall Effect in Bipolar Graphene p−n−p Junctions". Physical Review Letters. 99 (16) 166804. arXiv:0705.3044. Bibcode:2007PhRvL..99p6804O. doi:10.1103/physrevlett.99.166804. ISSN 0031-9007. PMID 17995279. S2CID 15518403.
- Heersche, Hubert B.; Jarillo-Herrero, Pablo; Oostinga, Jeroen B.; Vandersypen, Lieven M. K.; Morpurgo, Alberto F. (2007). "Bipolar supercurrent in graphene". Nature. 446 (7131). Springer Science and Business Media LLC: 56–59. arXiv:cond-mat/0612121. Bibcode:2007Natur.446...56H. doi:10.1038/nature05555. ISSN 0028-0836. PMID 17330038. S2CID 4337771.
- Gabor, N. M.; Song, J. C. W.; Ma, Q.; Nair, N. L.; Taychatanapat, T.; Watanabe, K.; Taniguchi, T.; Levitov, L. S.; Jarillo-Herrero, P. (October 6, 2011). "Hot Carrier-Assisted Intrinsic Photoresponse in Graphene". Science. 334 (6056). American Association for the Advancement of Science (AAAS): 648–652. arXiv:1108.3826. Bibcode:2011Sci...334..648G. doi:10.1126/science.1211384. ISSN 0036-8075. PMID 21979935. S2CID 22702019.
- Hunt, B.; Sanchez-Yamagishi, J. D.; Young, A. F.; Yankowitz, M.; LeRoy, B. J.; Watanabe, K.; Taniguchi, T.; Moon, P.; Koshino, M.; Jarillo-Herrero, P.; Ashoori, R. C. (May 16, 2013). "Massive Dirac Fermions and Hofstadter Butterfly in a van der Waals Heterostructure". Science. 340 (6139). American Association for the Advancement of Science (AAAS): 1427–1430. arXiv:1303.6942. Bibcode:2013Sci...340.1427H. doi:10.1126/science.1237240. ISSN 0036-8075. PMID 23686343. S2CID 37694594.
- Dai, S.; Fei, Z.; Ma, Q.; Rodin, A. S.; Wagner, M.; McLeod, A. S.; Liu, M. K.; Gannett, W.; Regan, W.; Watanabe, K.; Taniguchi, T.; Thiemens, M.; Dominguez, G.; Neto, A. H. C.; Zettl, A.; Keilmann, F.; Jarillo-Herrero, P.; Fogler, M. M.; Basov, D. N. (March 6, 2014). "Tunable Phonon Polaritons in Atomically Thin van der Waals Crystals of Boron Nitride". Science. 343 (6175). American Association for the Advancement of Science (AAAS): 1125–1129. Bibcode:2014Sci...343.1125D. doi:10.1126/science.1246833. hdl:1721.1/90317. ISSN 0036-8075. PMID 24604197. S2CID 4253950.
- Bretheau, Landry; Wang, Joel I-Jan; Pisoni, Riccardo; Watanabe, Kenji; Taniguchi, Takashi; Jarillo-Herrero, Pablo (May 1, 2017). "Tunnelling spectroscopy of Andreev states in graphene". Nature Physics. 13 (8). Springer Science and Business Media LLC: 756–760. arXiv:1703.10655. Bibcode:2017NatPh..13..756B. doi:10.1038/nphys4110. hdl:1721.1/121327. ISSN 1745-2473. S2CID 119094173.
- Sanchez-Yamagishi, Javier D.; Luo, Jason Y.; Young, Andrea F.; Hunt, Benjamin M.; Watanabe, Kenji; Taniguchi, Takashi; Ashoori, Raymond C.; Jarillo-Herrero, Pablo (October 31, 2016). "Helical edge states and fractional quantum Hall effect in a graphene electron–hole bilayer". Nature Nanotechnology. 12 (2). Springer Science and Business Media LLC: 118–122. arXiv:1602.06815. doi:10.1038/nnano.2016.214. ISSN 1748-3387. PMID 27798608. S2CID 4944107.
- Klein, D. R.; MacNeill, D.; Lado, J. L.; Soriano, D.; Navarro-Moratalla, E.; Watanabe, K.; Taniguchi, T.; Manni, S.; Canfield, P.; Fernández-Rossier, J.; Jarillo-Herrero, P. (May 3, 2018). "Probing magnetism in 2D van der Waals crystalline insulators via electron tunneling". Science. 360 (6394): 1218–1222. arXiv:1801.10075. Bibcode:2018Sci...360.1218K. doi:10.1126/science.aar3617. ISSN 0036-8075. PMID 29724904. S2CID 4783010.
- Huang, Bevin; Clark, Genevieve; Klein, Dahlia R.; MacNeill, David; Navarro-Moratalla, Efrén; Seyler, Kyle L.; Wilson, Nathan; McGuire, Michael A.; Cobden, David H.; Xiao, Di; Yao, Wang; Jarillo-Herrero, Pablo; Xu, Xiaodong (April 23, 2018). "Electrical control of 2D magnetism in bilayer CrI_{3}". Nature Nanotechnology. 13 (7). Springer Science and Business Media LLC: 544–548. arXiv:1802.06979. Bibcode:2018NatNa..13..544H. doi:10.1038/s41565-018-0121-3. ISSN 1748-3387. PMID 29686292. S2CID 13751595.
- Cao, Yuan; Fatemi, Valla; Demir, Ahmet; Fang, Shiang; Tomarken, Spencer L.; Luo, Jason Y.; Sanchez-Yamagishi, Javier D.; Watanabe, Kenji; Taniguchi, Takashi; Kaxiras, Efthimios; Ashoori, Ray C.; Jarillo-Herrero, Pablo (March 5, 2018). "Correlated insulator behaviour at half-filling in magic-angle graphene superlattices". Nature. 556 (7699). Springer Science and Business Media LLC: 80–84. arXiv:1802.00553. Bibcode:2018Natur.556...80C. doi:10.1038/nature26154. ISSN 0028-0836. PMID 29512654. S2CID 4601086.
- Wu, Sanfeng; Fatemi, Valla; Gibson, Quinn D.; Watanabe, Kenji; Taniguchi, Takashi; Cava, Robert J.; Jarillo-Herrero, Pablo (January 4, 2018). "Observation of the quantum spin Hall effect up to 100 kelvin in a monolayer crystal". Science. 359 (6371). American Association for the Advancement of Science (AAAS): 76–79. arXiv:1711.03584. Bibcode:2018Sci...359...76W. doi:10.1126/science.aan6003. ISSN 0036-8075. PMID 29302010. S2CID 206660894.
- Seyler, Kyle L.; Zhong, Ding; Klein, Dahlia R.; Gao, Shiyuan; Zhang, Xiaoou; Huang, Bevin; Navarro-Moratalla, Efrén; Yang, Li; Cobden, David H.; McGuire, Michael A.; Yao, Wang; Xiao, Di; Jarillo-Herrero, Pablo; Xu, Xiaodong (December 4, 2017). "Ligand-field helical luminescence in a 2D ferromagnetic insulator". Nature Physics. 14 (3). Springer Science and Business Media LLC: 277–281. arXiv:1710.05550. doi:10.1038/s41567-017-0006-7. ISSN 1745-2473. S2CID 4956413.
