= Jerome J. Connor =

American civil engineer (1931–2024)

Jerome J. "Jerry" Connor Jr. (May 19, 1932 – March 31, 2024) was an American civil engineer and professor. He taught at the Massachusetts Institute of Technology (MIT) for over 50 years and was an emeritus professor of the university. He was known for his work on motion-based design and computational mechanics. He was also a dean of engineering at Northeastern University.

== Early life and education ==
Connor was born in Dorchester, Massachusetts on 19 May 1932. He attended from Boston College High School. He obtained his bachelor of science from MIT in 1953. At MIT, Connor served in the US military's Reserve Officer Training Corps (ROTC). He later obtained his master’s and doctor of science degrees in civil engineering from MIT.

== Academic career ==
From 1959 until his retirement in 2014, he was a professor in the university's Department of Civil and Environmental Engineering. Early in his career, he also worked at the U.S. Army Materials Technology Laboratory, helping to design missile systems during the Vietnam War.

In 1970, Connor was a visiting professor at the University of Southampton in England. In 1983, he served as dean of engineering at Northeastern University. The same year, he was appointed director of the MIT Sea Grant Program.

Connor co-authored two textbooks with Carlos Brebbia on computational fluid mechanics. He also authored the textbooks Introduction to Structural Motion Control (2003) and Structural Motion Engineering (2014).

== Awards and recognition ==
- On April 29, 2009, Connor was awarded an honorary doctorate from Aristotle University of Thessaloniki in recognition of his contributions to computational mechanics and motion-based design.
- The paper “A Sensing Skin for Large-Scale Surface Monitoring of Infrastructures,” which he co-authored received the Herzog Award from the Boston Society of Civil Engineers.
- In 2026, MIT created the Professor Jerome J. Connor Memorial Award in his honour.

== Books ==
- Connor, J. J. Introduction to Structural Motion Control. Prentice Hall, 2003.
- Connor, J. J. Structural Motion Engineering. Springer, 2014.
- Connor, J. J., and Faraji, S. Fundamentals of Structural Engineering. Springer, 2012; 2nd ed., 2016.
- Brebbia, C. A., and Connor, J. J. Finite Element Techniques for Fluid Flow. Butterworths, 1976.
- Connor, J. J. Analysis of Structural Member Systems. MIT Press, 1976.

== Selected articles ==
- Brebbia, C. A., and Connor, J. J. “Geometrically nonlinear finite-element analysis.” Journal of the Engineering Mechanics Division 95(2), 1969: 463–483. https://doi.org/10.1061/JMCEA3.0001109
- Demosthenes C. Angelides, Connor, J.J. “Response of fixed offshore structures in random sea.” Earthquake Engineering Structural Dynamics, 503-526 Volume 8, Issue 6. 1980 https://doi.org/10.1002/eqe.4290080603
- Gantes, C. J., Connor, J. J., Logcher, R. D., & Rosenfeld, Y. “Structural analysis and design of deployable structures.” Computers & Structures 32(3–4), 1989: 661–669. https://doi.org/10.1016/0045-7949(89)90354-4
- Connor, J. J., and Gantes, C. J. “A Systematic Design Methodology for Deployable Structures.” International Journal of Space Structures, 1994. https://doi.org/10.1177/026635119400900202
- Connor, J. J. “New Structural Systems for Tall Buildings: The Space-Truss Concept.” Journal of Structural Design of Tall Buildings 4, 1995: 155–168. https://doi.org/10.1002/tal.4320040206
- C. C. Pouangare, J. J. Connor. “A new method for the design of tall buildings: The mit design method.” Journal of Structural Design of Tall and Special Buildings 4 1995: 169-184. https://doi.org/10.1002/tal.4320040207
