= Andrew M. Rappe =

American chemistry scientist

- Education: Harvard University; MIT
- Known for: Ferroelectrics; Piezoelectrics; Bulk photovoltaic Mechanochemistry; Light-matter interactions
- Awards: National Science Foundation CAREER Award; Alfred P. Sloan Research Fellowship; Camille Dreyfus Teacher-Scholar Award; Fellow of the American Physical Society; Humboldt Research Award
- Scientific career
- Fields: Theoretical chemistry Condensed matter physics
- Doctoral advisor: John Joannopoulos
- Website: https://web.sas.upenn.edu/rappe-lab/

Andrew Marshall Rappe is an American physicist specializing in theoretical and computational chemistry, physics, and materials science. He is the Blanchard Professor of Chemistry and a Professor of Materials Science and Engineering at the University of Pennsylvania. His work features the design of new materials for sustainable energy and advanced electronics by demonstrating how microscopic atomic and electronic structures determine material behavior.

== Education and career ==
Rappe earned his B.A. in Chemistry and Physics summa cum laude from Harvard University (1986) and his Ph.D. in Physics and Chemistry from MIT (1992). His dissertation, “AB initio theoretical studies of transition-metal, molecular, and photonic band-gap materials” was supervised by John Joannopoulos. After a postdoctoral fellowship at UC Berkeley, he joined the faculty at the University of Pennsylvania in 1994. He became an associate professor in 2000 and a full professor in 2006.

== Recognition ==
Honors include an NSF CAREER award in 1997, an Alfred P. Sloan Research Fellowship in 1998, and a Camille Dreyfus Teacher-Scholar Award in 1999. He was named a Fellow of the American Physical Society in 2006. He was awarded a Humboldt Research Award in 2017 and a Cheney Fellowship at the University of Leeds in 2018.

Rappe is one of two founding co-directors of the Vagelos Integrated Program in Energy Research (VIPER) at Penn, which focuses on preparing students for careers in sustainable energy.

== Research ==
Rappe's research contributions span several major scientific areas, including ferroelectrics, piezoelectrics, the bulk photovoltaic effect, catalysis and surface science, mechanochemistry, and light-matter interactions. He has made contributions to understanding how these materials change structures at the nanoscale, particularly those driven by temperature. He has worked on the mechanism of the bulk photovoltaic materials based on first-principles calculations. In the field of electrochemistry, Rappe focuses on theoretically designing catalysts for energy conversion. His group has also analysed problems in mechanochemistry, illustrating how mechanical forces, such as stress and strain, can be used to trigger or control chemical reactions on surfaces.
