= Michelle Povinelli =

American physicist and nanophotonics researcher

Michelle Lynn Povinelli
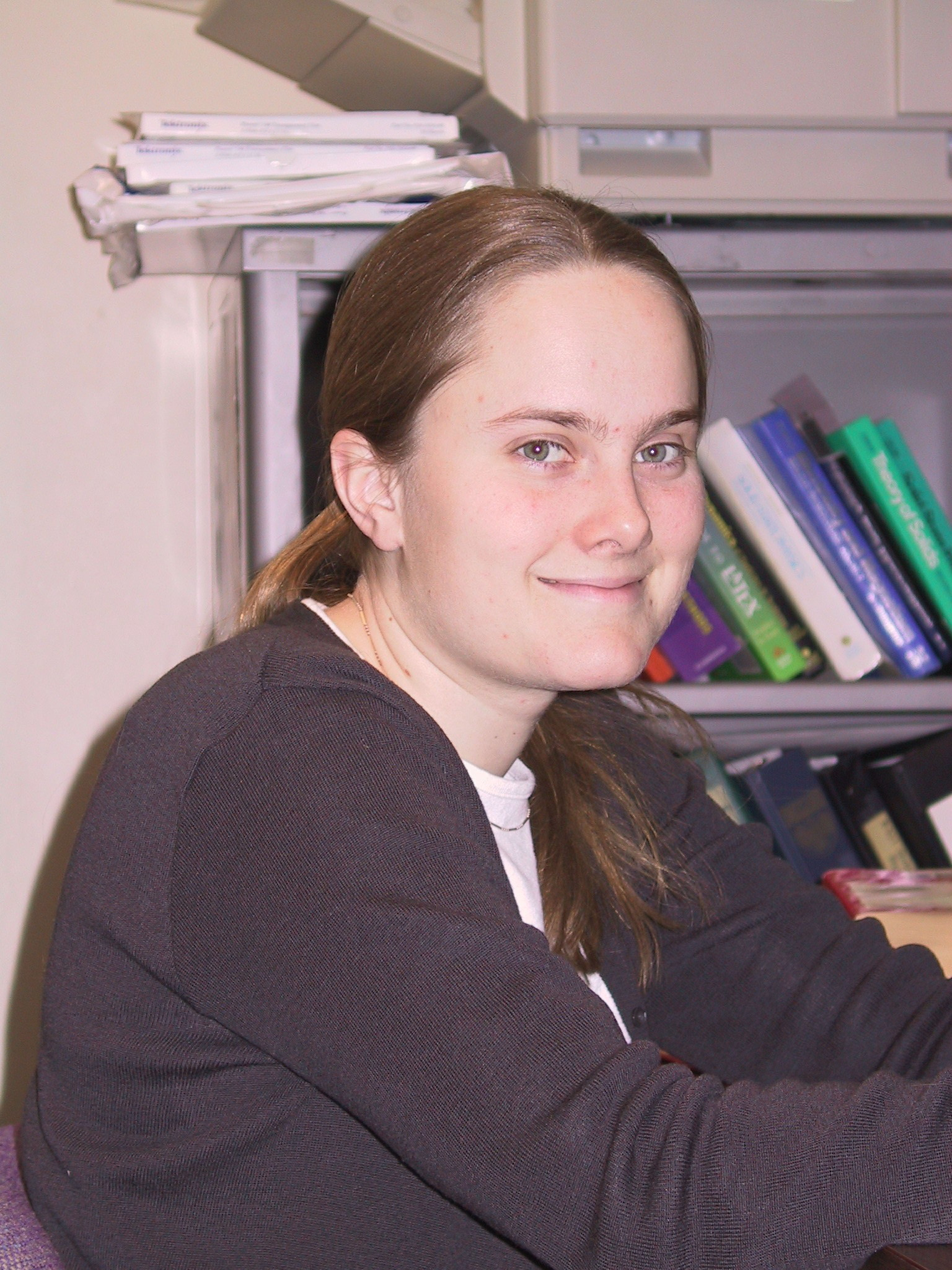
- Michelle Povinelli in 2001
- Education: Magnificat High School; University of Chicago; University of Cambridge; Massachusetts Institute of Technology
- Scientific career
- Fields: Nanophotonics
- Workplaces: Stanford University (2004–2008); University of Southern California (2008–)
- Thesis: Characteristics of defect modes, slow light, and disorder in photonic crystals (2004)
- Doctoral advisor: John Joannopoulos
- Website: viterbi.usc.edu/directory/faculty/Povinelli/Michelle

Michelle Povinelli (born 1975) is a Professor of Electrical Engineering and Physics and Astronomy at the University of Southern California (USC) and Fellow of the OSA and SPIE. Povinelli's research in nanophotonics focuses on the behavior of light inside complex materials.

Povinelli completed her doctoral research at the Massachusetts Institute of Technology in 2004, followed by a postdoc on Stanford University from 2004 to 2008. She became a professor at USC in 2008. In 2010, Povinelli was awarded a Presidential Early Career Awards for Scientists and Engineers. She was appointed to a full professorship in 2018.

== Education and career ==
Povinelli received her bachelor's degree in physics from the University of Chicago and masters in physics from the University of Cambridge, both in 1998. She completed a Ph.D. in physics titled Characteristics of defect modes, slow light, and disorder in photonic crystals at the Massachusetts Institute of Technology in 2004, with John Joannopoulos as her advisor. Povinelli was a postdoc at Stanford in the Gintzon Laboratory under a L'Oreal For Women in Science Postdoctoral Fellowship from 2004 to 2008. She joined the University of Southern California (USC) in 2008 under the Gabilan Assistant Professorship in the Women in Science and Engineering program.

Povinelli received two research awards in 2010: the National Science Foundation Career Award and an Army Research Office Young Investigator Award. Povinelli became a Fellow of the Optical Society of America in 2016 for contributions to the theory and application of light forces in optical nanostructures and for "the understanding and realization of nanostructures for solar energy conversion". In 2018, Povinelli was promoted to a full professorship at USC. That year, she and Lorraine Turcotte organised the Women in Science and Engineering Research Horizons Symposium following an anonymous donation of $20 million towards increasing gender diversity in science at USC.

== Research ==
Povinelli's research is primarily in nanophotonics, focusing on the behavior of light as it moves through devices like solar cells and optical chips.

An early branch of research undertaken by Povinelli involved using laser beams to trap and assemble two-dimensional nano-structures - hundreds at a time - for creation of new materials and chemical filters. Unlike optical traps consisting of free-space laser beams, Povinelli patterned a silicon wafer with holes to create a photonic crystal, each hole 300 nm in diameter. Particles are then moved into the holes to form a square crystal lattice.

Povinelli predicted and proved that light could exert a force when guided through silicon strip waveguides, which was shown to move a nearby strip. Such methods are useful for optical circuits and re-routing of signals. Another prediction of Povinelli is increased solar cell efficiency when incorporating nanostructures.

Working with Northrop Grumman, Povinelli developed a new material able to self-regulate the temperature of satellites made of a mixture of silicon and vanadium dioxide. To combat temperature variations of over 200 degrees Fahrenheit without relying on physical shutters or heat pipes that consume large amounts of power, the phase change behaviour of vanadium dioxide is used instead. At low temperatures it acts as an insulator, and at high temperatures it is a conductor which radiates heat. With a 20 fold improvement in temperature management, this research may have applications in maintaining building temperatures.

In 2019 it was announced that the research group of Povinelli will work in the Breakthrough Starshot project, towards a proof-of-concept demonstration of ultra-fast light-driven nanocrafts. This is work towards the first launch to Alpha Centauri, led by a consortium of scientists such as Steven Chu, Mae Jemison, and Martin Rees. Povinelli is working towards the light sail portion based on research on thermal regulation.

=== Awards and honours ===
- 1993: The White House Presidential Scholar
- 2006: L'Oreal for Women in Science Fellowship
- 2009: NSF Career Award
- 2009: Army Young Investigator Award
- 2010: MIT Innovators Under 35
- 2010: Presidential Early Career Awards for Scientists and Engineers
- 2016: Fellow of the Optical Society of America
- 2018: Gabilan Distinguished Associate Professorship in Science and Engineering at University of Southern California
- 2019: Fellow of SPIE

Povinelli has been a member of Phi Beta Kappa and Sigma Xi.

=== Notable talks ===
- 2018 Plenary talk Microstructured Materials for Thermal Heating and Memory, META conference
- 2018 Plenary talk Using Microphotonic Structures for Optical Trapping and Thermal Logic, Annual Meeting of the American Physical Society Far West Section

== Personal life ==
Povinelli studies capoeira. In an interview with Viterabi Magazine, she describes capoeira as combining "hard physical training, elements of dance and music, and a strong sense of community".
