= John Houser =

John Houser may refer to:

- John Houser (rower) (1909–1991), American Olympic rower
- John Houser (American football) (born 1935), American football player
- John Sherrill Houser (born 1935), American sculptor and painter
- John Russell Houser, perpetrator of the 2015 Lafayette shooting
