= Brian Wardle (academic) =

Brian Lee Wardle (born 1969) is a professor in the Department of Aeronautics and Astronautics at the Massachusetts Institute of Technology.

Wardle is Director of MIT's Nano-Engineered Composite aerospace STructures (NECST) Consortium, and is a principal member of the Technology Laboratory for Advanced Materials and Structures (TELAMS). He is active in the MEMS@MIT community as part of the Microsystems Technology Laboratory (MTL).

Wardle's research interests are in the area of structures and materials, primarily focusing on aerospace applications, and currently focuses on composite systems, active materials, structural health monitoring (SHM), and power-conversion devices at the MEMS scale. Other topics of interest to his group include structural mechanics, durability, advanced material systems, safety/reliability and performance of structural systems, microelectromechanical systems (MEMS), structural health monitoring and nanocomposites.

The MIT NECST Consortium, founded by Wardle in 2006, actively develops technologies for improving the performance of advanced aerospace materials/structures, primarily through strategic use of carbon nanotubes (CNTs) combined with traditional advanced composites to form hybrid architectures. The group specializes in a novel synthesis technique for producing high-quality, long (several millimeters), aligned CNTs which can be strategically incorporated in existing advanced composite systems.
