= Nelson Repenning =

American business scholar

Nelson Repenning is an American business scholar, currently the School of Management Distinguished Professor of System Dynamics and Organization Studies at MIT Sloan School of Management.
