= John R. Hauser =

John Richard Hauser is the Kirin Professor of Marketing and Head of the Marketing Group at the MIT Sloan School of Management. He is one of the founders of the field of Marketing Science and was Editor-in-Chief of the academic journal Marketing Science from 1989 to 1995.

He holds S.B. and S.M. in EECS from MIT, both earned in 1973. He also earned an S.M. in Civil & Environmental Engineering from MIT, in 1973. . Advised by John D.C. Little, he received his Sc.D. from MIT after publishing his dissertation in operations research in 1975.

He was elected to the 2006 class of Fellows of the Institute for Operations Research and the Management Sciences.
