= List of Clarivate Citation laureates in Economic Sciences =

The following is a list of Clarivate Citation Laureates considered likely to win the Nobel Memorial Prize in Economic Sciences. Since 2025, twenty-nine of the 113 citation laureates selected starting in 2002 have eventually been awarded a Nobel Prize: Daniel Kahneman (2002), Robert F. Engle and Clive Granger (2003), Paul Krugman (2008), Oliver E. Williamson (2009), Thomas J. Sargent and Christopher A. Sims (2011), Eugene Fama, Lars Peter Hansen and Robert J. Shiller (2013), Jean Tirole (2014), Angus Deaton (2015), Oliver Hart and Bengt Holmström (2016), Richard Thaler (2017), Paul Romer and William Nordhaus (2018), Robert B. Wilson and Paul Milgrom (2020), Joshua Angrist and David Card (2021), Douglas Diamond (2022), Claudia Goldin (2023), Daron Acemoglu, Simon Johnson and James A. Robinson (2024), Joel Mokyr, Philippe Aghion and Peter Howitt (2025), Robert E. Hall and Michael Woodford (2026).

== Laureates ==
	Citation Laureates	Nationality	Motivations	Institute
2002–2005
^{2003}	Robert F. Engle (born 1942)	United States	"for contributions on econometrics, particularly on time series, Autoregressive conditional heteroskedasticity (ARCH) and cointegration."	University of California, San Diego
^{2003}	Clive Granger (1934–2009)	United Kingdom	"for contributions on econometrics, particularly on time series, Autoregressive conditional heteroskedasticity (ARCH) and cointegration."	University of California, San Diego
^{2002}	Daniel Kahneman (1934–2024)	Israel; United States	"for pioneering research on behavioral economics, particularly on the psychology of judgment and decision-making."	Princeton University; University of British Columbia
	Robert Barro (born 1944)	United States	"for contributions on developing new classical macroeconomics."	Harvard University
^{2013}	Eugene Fama (born 1939)	United States	"for contributions on financial economics, especially on developing the Fama–French three-factor model."	University of Chicago
	Kenneth French (born 1954)	United States	"for contributions on financial economics, especially on developing the Fama–French three-factor model."	Dartmouth College
^{2018}	Paul Romer (born 1955)	United States	"for contributions in endogenous growth theory."	New York University
^{2017}	Richard Thaler (born 1945)	United States	"for contributions to behavioral economics, behavioral finance and nudge theory."	Cornell University; University of Chicago
2006
^{2008}	Paul Krugman (born 1953)	United States	"for research on the effects of economies of scale and of consumer preferences for diverse goods, and the services in international trade and the geographic distribution of economic activity."	Princeton University
	Jagdish Bhagwati (born 1934)	India; United States	"for their significant contributions to international trade theory and economic development."	Columbia University
	Avinash Dixit (born 1944)	India; United States	"for their significant contributions to international trade theory and economic development."	Princeton University
—N/a	Dale W. Jorgenson (1933–2022)	United States	"for research on the relationship between productivity and economic growth, the economics of climate change, and the intersection between economics and statistics."	Harvard University
^{2016}	Oliver Hart (born 1948)	United Kingdom; United States	"for research studies on corporate governance, theory of the firm and corporate finance."	Harvard University
^{2016}	Bengt Holmström (born 1949)	Finland	"for research studies on corporate governance, theory of the firm and corporate finance."	Massachusetts Institute of Technology
^{2009}	Oliver E. Williamson (1932–2020)	United States	"for research studies on corporate governance, theory of the firm and corporate finance."	University of Pennsylvania; University of California, Berkeley
2007
	Elhanan Helpman (born 1946)	Israel	"for contributions on international trade, particularly on the relationship between economic growth and trade and the political economy of trade policy."	Harvard University; Tel Aviv University
	Gene Grossman (born 1955)	United States	"for contributions on international trade, particularly on the relationship between economic growth and trade and the political economy of trade policy."	Princeton University
^{2014}	Jean Tirole (born 1953)	France	"for significant contributions in understanding the economic impact of industrial organization."	Massachusetts Institute of Technology; Toulouse School of Economics
^{2020}	Robert B. Wilson (born 1937)	United States	"for furthering the role of game theory in industrial organization and developing new auction formats."	Stanford University
^{2020}	Paul Milgrom (born 1948)	United States	"for furthering the role of game theory in industrial organization and developing new auction formats."	Stanford University
2008
^{2013}	Lars Peter Hansen (born 1952)	United States	"for their contributions to dynamic econometric models."	University of Chicago
^{2011}	Thomas J. Sargent (born 1943)	United States	"for their contributions to dynamic econometric models."	New York University; Hoover Institution
^{2011}	Christopher A. Sims (born 1942)	United States	"for their contributions to dynamic econometric models."	Princeton University
—N/a	Armen Alchian (1914–2013)	United States	"for their publications on property rights and their contributions to the theory of the firm."	University of California, Los Angeles
—N/a	Harold Demsetz (1930–2019)	United States	"for their publications on property rights and their contributions to the theory of the firm."	University of California, Los Angeles
—N/a	Martin Feldstein (1939–2019)	United States	"for his research on public economics, including taxation, social security, health economics and many other topics."	Harvard University; National Bureau of Economic Research
2009
	Ernst Fehr (born 1956)	Switzerland; Austria	"for their contributions to behavioral economics, including issues of preferences, fairness, and cooperation."	University of Zürich
	Matthew Rabin (born 1963)	United States	"for their contributions to behavioral economics, including issues of preferences, fairness, and cooperation."	Harvard Business School
^{2018}	William Nordhaus (1941–2026)	United States	"for their contributions to environmental economics, particularly with respect to climate change."	Yale University
—N/a	Martin Weitzman (1942–2019)	United States	"for their contributions to environmental economics, particularly with respect to climate change."	Harvard University
	John B. Taylor (born 1946)	United States	"for their research on monetary policy."	Stanford University; Hoover Institution
	Jordi Galí (born 1961)	Spain	"for their research on monetary policy."	Pompeu Fabra University; Barcelona School of Economics
	Mark Gertler (born 1951)	United States	"for their research on monetary policy."	New York University
2010
—N/a	Alberto Alesina (1957–2020)	Italy	"for theoretical and empirical studies on the relationship between politics and macroeconomics, and specifically for research on politico-economic cycles."	Harvard University
	Nobuhiro Kiyotaki (born 1955)	Japan	"for formulation of the Kiyotaki–Moore model, which describes how small shocks to an economy may lead to a cycle of lower output resulting from a decline in collateral values that create a restrictive credit environment."	Princeton University
	John H. Moore (born 1954)	United Kingdom	"for formulation of the Kiyotaki–Moore model, which describes how small shocks to an economy may lead to a cycle of lower output resulting from a decline in collateral values that create a restrictive credit environment."	University of Edinburgh; London School of Economics
	Kevin M. Murphy (born 1958)	United States	"for pioneering empirical research in social economics, including wage inequality and labor demand, unemployment, addiction, and the economic return on investment in medical research among other topics."	Hoover Institution; University of Chicago
2011
^{2022}	Douglas Diamond (born 1953)	United States	"for his analysis of financial intermediation and monitoring."	University of Chicago
	Anne Osborn Krueger (born 1934)	United States	"for their description of rent-seeking behavior and its implications."	Johns Hopkins University
—N/a	Gordon Tullock (1922–2014)	United States	"for their description of rent-seeking behavior and its implications."	George Mason University School of Law
	Jerry A. Hausman (born 1946)	United States	"for their contributions to econometrics, specifically the Hausman specification test and the White standard errors test."	Massachusetts Institute of Technology
—N/a	Halbert White (1950–2012)	United States	"for their contributions to econometrics, specifically the Hausman specification test and the White standard errors test."	University of California, San Diego
2012
—N/a	Tony Atkinson (1944–2017)	United Kingdom	"for empirical research on consumption, income and savings, poverty and health, and well-being."	Oxford University
^{2015}	Angus Deaton (born 1945)	United Kingdom	"for empirical research on consumption, income and savings, poverty and health, and well-being."	Princeton University
—N/a	Stephen Ross (1944–2017)	United States	"for his arbitrage pricing theory and other fundamental contributions to finance."	Massachusetts Institute of Technology
^{2013}	Robert J. Shiller (born 1946)	United States	"for pioneering contributions to financial market volatility and the dynamics of asset prices."	Yale University
2013
^{2021}	Joshua Angrist (born 1960)	Israel; United States	"for their advancement of empirical microeconomics."	Massachusetts Institute of Technology
^{2021}	David Card (born 1956)	Canada; United States	"for their advancement of empirical microeconomics."	University of California, Berkeley
—N/a	Alan Krueger (1960–2019)	United States	"for their advancement of empirical microeconomics."	Princeton University
	David Forbes Hendry (born 1944)	United Kingdom	"for their contributions to economic time-series, including modeling, testing and forecasting."	University of Oxford
	M. Hashem Pesaran (born 1946)	United States; Iran	"for their contributions to economic time-series, including modeling, testing and forecasting."	University of Cambridge; University of Southern California
	Peter C. B. Phillips (born 1948)	United Kingdom	"for their contributions to economic time-series, including modeling, testing and forecasting."	Yale University
	Sam Peltzman (born 1940)	United States	"for extending economic theories of regulation."	University of Chicago Booth School of Business
	Richard Posner (1939–2026)	United States	"for extending economic theories of regulation."	University of Chicago Law School
2014
^{2025}	Philippe Aghion (born 1956)	France	"for contributions to Schumpeterian growth theory."	Harvard University
^{2025}	Peter Howitt (born 1946)	Canada	"for contributions to Schumpeterian growth theory."	Brown University
—N/a	William Baumol (1922–2017)	United States	"for their advancement of the study of entrepreneurism."	New York University
	Israel M. Kirzner (born 1930)	United States	"for their advancement of the study of entrepreneurism."	New York University
	Mark Granovetter (born 1943)	United States	"for his pioneering research in economic sociology."	Stanford University
2015
	Richard Blundell (born 1952)	United Kingdom	"for microeconometric research on labor markets and consumer behavior."	University College London; Institute for Fiscal Studies
	John A. List (born 1968)	United States	"for advancing field experiments in economics."	University of Chicago
	Charles F. Manski (born 1948)	United States	"for his description of partial identification and economic analysis of social interactions."	Northwestern University
2016
	Olivier Blanchard (born 1948)	France	"for contributions to macroeconomics, including determinants of economic fluctuations and employment."	Massachusetts Institute of Technology; Peterson Institute for International Economics
—N/a	Edward Lazear (1948–2020)	United States	"for his development of the distinctive field of personnel economics."	Hoover Institution; Stanford Graduate School of Business
	Marc Melitz (born 1968)	United States	"for pioneering descriptions of firm heterogeneity and international trade."	Harvard University
2017
	Colin Camerer (born 1959)	United States	"for pioneering research in behavioral economics and in neuroeconomics."	California Institute of Technology
	George Loewenstein (born 1955)	United States	"for pioneering research in behavioral economics and in neuroeconomics."	Carnegie Mellon University
^{2026}	Robert Hall (born 1943)	United States	"for his analysis of worker productivity and studies of recessions and unemployment."	Stanford University
—N/a	Michael C. Jensen (1939-2024)	United States	"for their contributions illuminating the dimensions of decisions in corporate finance."	Harvard University
	Stewart Myers (born 1940)	United States	"for their contributions illuminating the dimensions of decisions in corporate finance."	Massachusetts Institute of Technology
	Raghuram Rajan (born 1963)	India	"for their contributions illuminating the dimensions of decisions in corporate finance."	University of Chicago
2018
	Manuel Arellano (born 1957)	Spain	"for contributions to panel data analysis, especially the Arellano–Bond estimator."	Center for Monetary and Financial Studies
	Steve Bond (born 1963)	United Kingdom	"for contributions to panel data analysis, especially the Arellano–Bond estimator."	Oxford University
	Wesley M. Cohen (born 1950)	United States	"for the introduction and development of the concept of absorptive capacity and its contribution to our understanding of technological innovation."	Duke University
	Daniel A. Levinthal (born 1957)	United States	"for the introduction and development of the concept of absorptive capacity and its contribution to our understanding of technological innovation."	University of Pennsylvania
	David M. Kreps (born 1950)	United States	"for contributions to dynamic economic phenomena."	Stanford University
2019
	W. Brian Arthur (born 1946)	United Kingdom	"for research exploring the consequences of increasing returns (or network effects) in economic systems."	Stanford University; Santa Fe Institute
	Ariel Rubinstein (born 1951)	Israel	"for development of formal theoretical economic models and especially models of bounded rationality."	New York University
	Søren Johansen (born 1939)	Denmark	"for contributions to econometrics and cointegration analysis."	University of Copenhagen
	Katarina Juselius-Johansen (born 1943)	Finland; Denmark	"for contributions to econometrics and cointegration analysis."	University of Copenhagen
2020
	David Dickey (born 1945)	United States	"for the statistical tests of a unit root in time-series analysis (Dickey and Fuller) and the statistical analysis of non-stationary time series (Perron)."	North Carolina State University
	Wayne Fuller (born 1931)	United States	"for the statistical tests of a unit root in time-series analysis (Dickey and Fuller) and the statistical analysis of non-stationary time series (Perron)."	Iowa State University
	Pierre Perron (born 1959)	Canada	"for the statistical tests of a unit root in time-series analysis (Dickey and Fuller) and the statistical analysis of non-stationary time series (Perron)."	Boston University
^{2023}	Claudia Goldin (born 1946)	United States	"for contributions to labor economics, especially her analysis of women and the gender pay gap."	Harvard University
	Steven T. Berry (born 1959)	United States	"for their BLP random coefficients logit model for demand estimation."	Yale University
	James A. Levinsohn (born 1958)	United States	"for their BLP random coefficients logit model for demand estimation."	Yale University
	Ariél Pakes (born 1949)	Canada; United States	"for their BLP random coefficients logit model for demand estimation."	Harvard University
2021
	David B. Audretsch (born 1954)	United States	"for pioneering research on entrepreneurship, innovation, and competition."	Indiana University
	David Teece (born 1948)	New Zealand; United States	"for pioneering research on entrepreneurship, innovation, and competition."	University of California, Berkeley
^{2025}	Joel Mokyr (born 1946)	United States; Israel	"for studies of the history and culture of technological progress and its economic consequences."	Northwestern University
	Carmen Reinhart (born 1955)	Cuba; United States	"for contributions to international macroeconomics and insights on global debt and financial crises."	Harvard Kennedy School
	Kenneth Rogoff (born 1953)	United States	"for contributions to international macroeconomics and insights on global debt and financial crises."	Harvard University
2022
^{2024}	Daron Acemoglu (born 1967)	Turkey; United States	"for far-reaching analysis of the role of political and economic institutions in shaping national development."	Massachusetts Institute of Technology
^{2024}	Simon Johnson (born 1963)	United Kingdom; United States	"for far-reaching analysis of the role of political and economic institutions in shaping national development."	Massachusetts Institute of Technology
^{2024}	James A. Robinson (born 1960)	United Kingdom	"for far-reaching analysis of the role of political and economic institutions in shaping national development."	University of Chicago
	Samuel Bowles (born 1939)	United States	"for providing evidence and models that broaden our understanding of economic behavior to include not only self interest but also reciprocity, altruism, and other forms of social cooperation."	Santa Fe Institute; University of Massachusetts
—N/a	Herbert Gintis (1940–2023)	United States	"for providing evidence and models that broaden our understanding of economic behavior to include not only self interest but also reciprocity, altruism, and other forms of social cooperation."	Santa Fe Institute; University of Massachusetts
—N/a	Richard Easterlin (1926–2024)	United States	"for pioneering contributions to the economics of happiness and subjective well-being."	University of Southern California
	Richard Layard (born 1934)	United Kingdom	"for pioneering contributions to the economics of happiness and subjective well-being."	London School of Economics
	Andrew Oswald (born 1953)	United Kingdom	"for pioneering contributions to the economics of happiness and subjective well-being."	University of Warwick
2023
	Raj Chetty (born 1979)	India; United States	"for understanding the determinants of economic opportunity and identifying policies to increase social mobility."	Harvard University
	Edward Glaeser (born 1967)	United States	"for penetrating analysis and insights on urban economics and the city as an engine of growth."	Harvard University
	Thomas Piketty (born 1971)	France	"for research on income and wealth inequality and its consequences."	Paris School of Economics
	Emmanuel Saez (born 1972)	France; United States	"for research on income and wealth inequality and its consequences."	University of California, Berkeley
	Gabriel Zucman (born 1986)	France	"for research on income and wealth inequality and its consequences."	Paris School of Economics; École Normale Supérieure
2024
	Janet Currie (born 1957)	Canada; United States	"for pioneering economic analysis of child development."	Princeton University
	Partha Dasgupta (born 1942)	India; United Kingdom	"for integrating nature and its resources in the human economy."	University of Cambridge
	Paolo Mauro (born ?)	Italy	"for empirical studies of the effects of corruption on investment and economic growth."	International Finance Corporation
2025
	David Autor (born 1964)	United States	"for seminal analysis of wage structure, earnings inequality, educational advance, and technological change."	Massachusetts Institute of Technology
	Lawrence F. Katz (born 1959)	United States	"for seminal analysis of wage structure, earnings inequality, educational advance, and technological change."	Harvard University
	Marianne Bertrand (born 1970)	Belgium	"for joint research on racial discrimination, corporate governance, and other aspects of labor economics determined by psychology and culture."	University of Chicago Booth School of Business
	Sendhil Mullainathan (born 1973)	India; United States	"for joint research on racial discrimination, corporate governance, and other aspects of labor economics determined by psychology and culture."	Massachusetts Institute of Technology
	Nicholas Bloom (born 1973)	United States; United Kingdom	"for analyzing the impact of economic and political uncertainty on investment, employment and growth."	Stanford University
2026
	Susan Athey (born 1970)	United States	"for pioneering analysis of the economics of information technology"	Stanford University
	Hal Varian (born 1947)	United States	"for pioneering analysis of the economics of information technology"	University of California, Berkeley
^{2026}	Michael Dean Woodford (born 1955)	United States	"for contributions to the theory and practice of monetary policy"	Columbia University
	Sidney G. Winter (born 1935)	United States	"for studies of economic dynamism and organizational behavior inspired by evolutionary theory"	University of Pennsylvania
