= Mark Gertler (economist) =

American economist

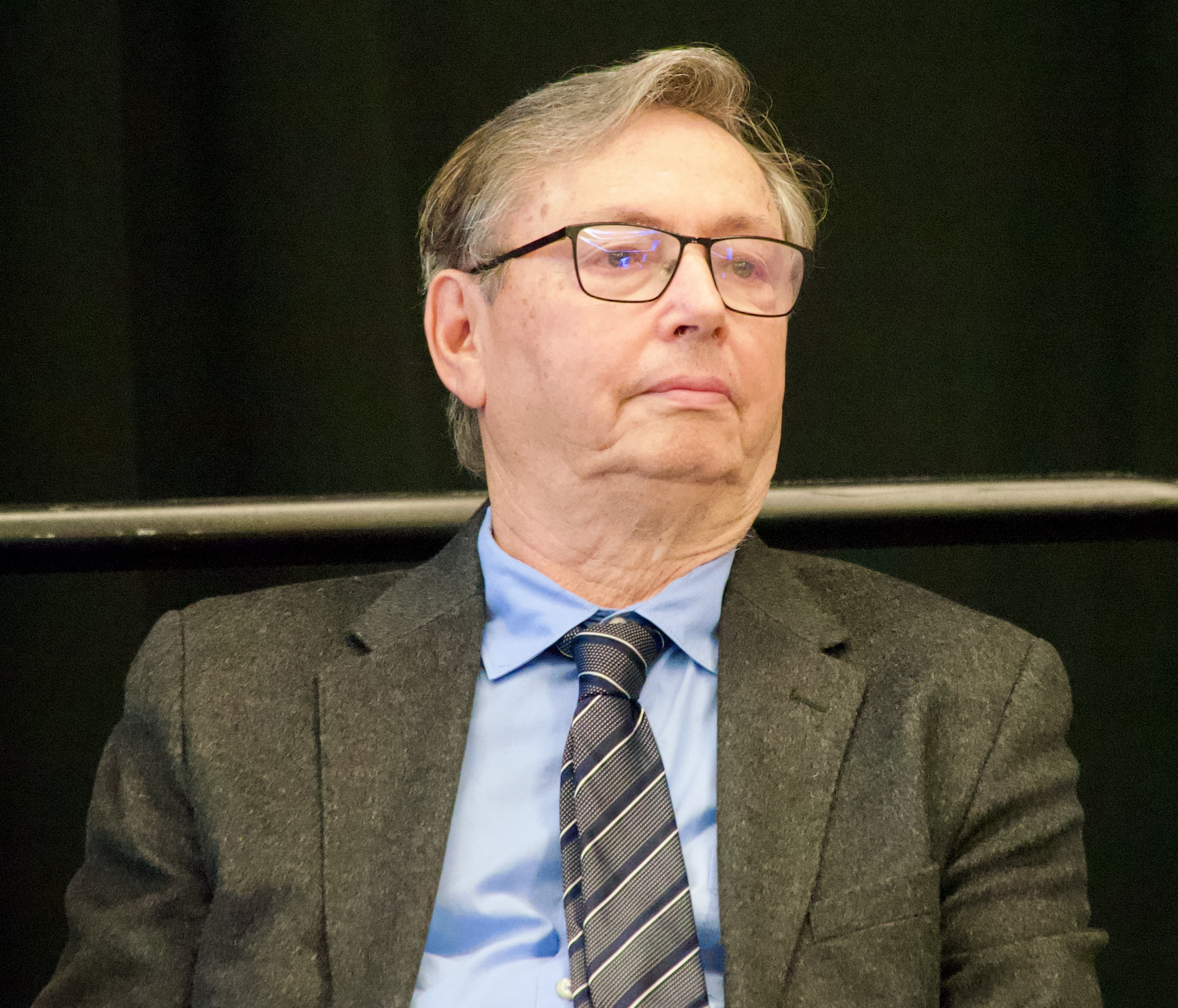
- Born: 1951 (age 74–75); Rosetown, Saskatchewan, Canada

Academic background
- Education: Stanford University; University of Wisconsin–Madison
- Doctoral advisor: Duncan K. Foley

Academic work
- Discipline: Macroeconomics; Monetary economics
- School or tradition: New Keynesian economics
- Institutions: New York University
- Notable ideas: Financial accelerator
- Awards: BBVA Foundation Frontiers of Knowledge Award (2020); Guggenheim Fellowship (2007)
- Website: Information at IDEAS / RePEc

Mark L. Gertler (born 1951) is an American economist. He is University Professor and Henry and Lucy Moses Professor of Economics at New York University (NYU) and a Research Associate of the National Bureau of Economic Research (NBER), where he co-directs the Program on Economic Fluctuations and Growth. His research concerns business cycles, monetary policy, and the role of financial frictions in macroeconomic fluctuations. He is best known for the "financial accelerator" model developed with Ben Bernanke and Simon Gilchrist, and for work on monetary policy rules with Richard Clarida and Jordi Galí. He is among the most cited economists in the world according to the IDEAS/RePEc rankings.

== Early life and education ==
Gertler was born in Rosetown, Saskatchewan, in 1951. He completed his B.A. in May 1973 from the University of Wisconsin–Madison, where he was elected to Phi Beta Kappa, and his Ph.D. in June 1978 from Stanford University. His doctoral advisor was Duncan K. Foley.

== Career ==
Gertler was an assistant professor at Cornell University from 1978 to 1981. He then moved to the University of Wisconsin–Madison, where he was promoted to associate professor in 1984 and full professor in 1988. He joined NYU as a professor in 1990. He was named the Henry and Lucy Moses Professor of Economics in 1999 and University Professor in 2021. At NYU he directed the C.V. Starr Center for Applied Economics from 1999 to 2003 and chaired the Department of Economics from 2003 to 2006.

He has held visiting positions at Stanford University, Princeton University, Columbia University, Yale University, and the Massachusetts Institute of Technology, and was the Mitchell Visiting Professor at Columbia in 2013–14 and the Taussig Visiting Professor at Harvard University in 2016–17.

Gertler has been affiliated with the NBER since 1987 and a Research Associate since 1990. Since 2013 he has co-directed the NBER Program on Economic Fluctuations and Growth with Pete Klenow. He served as an academic consultant to the Federal Reserve Bank of New York from 1994 to 2019 and on its Academic Advisory Board from 2005 to 2019, and has been a consultant to the European Central Bank since 2020.

He was co-editor of the NBER Macroeconomics Annual (2001–2005), the American Economic Review (2005–2011), and the Journal of Economic Perspectives (2016–2018), and earlier co-editor of Economics Letters (1996–2000).

== Research ==
Gertler's work centers on how imperfections in credit markets affect the real economy.

=== Financial accelerator ===
In a 1989 paper, Bernanke and Gertler showed that when borrowers' net worth falls, agency costs of external finance rise, reducing investment and amplifying downturns. With Simon Gilchrist, they embedded this mechanism in a quantitative dynamic stochastic general equilibrium model in "The Financial Accelerator in a Quantitative Business Cycle Framework" (1999), which became a standard reference for analyzing the interaction of financial conditions and the business cycle. Related empirical work with Gilchrist documented that small manufacturing firms respond more sharply than large firms to monetary tightening.

The BBVA Foundation Frontiers of Knowledge Award committee credited this line of research with defining the standard model for business cycle and monetary policy analysis and noted that its relevance became clear after the 2008 financial crisis.

=== Monetary policy rules ===
With Richard Clarida and Jordi Galí, Gertler estimated forward-looking monetary policy reaction functions for the United States and found that the Federal Reserve's response to expected inflation became substantially more aggressive after Paul Volcker's appointment in 1979. Their 1999 survey "The Science of Monetary Policy: A New Keynesian Perspective" set out the New Keynesian framework for policy analysis and is among the most cited papers in monetary economics.

Gertler and Bernanke published "Should Central Banks Respond to Movements in Asset Prices?" in the American Economic Review in 2001, five years before Bernanke replaced Alan Greenspan as Chairman of the Federal Reserve Board of Governors. The paper, which deals retrospectively with the stock market bubble of the Internet years, has become a widely cited policy paper in economics. Bernanke and Gertler argue that a central bank committed to flexible inflation targeting should respond to asset prices only insofar as they affect the inflation outlook, and that a more aggressive approach of managing "asset price bubbles" would be ineffective or counterproductive.

=== Banking and the financial crisis ===
After 2008, Gertler's work turned to models of financial intermediaries. With Nobuhiro Kiyotaki he developed a framework in which bank balance sheet constraints transmit shocks to the real economy and analyzed unconventional monetary policy and bank runs. With Peter Karadi he built a model of unconventional monetary policy in which the central bank lends directly when private intermediation breaks down, providing a framework for evaluating the large-scale asset purchases undertaken by central banks during the crisis.

=== Monetary policy transmission ===
In "Monetary Policy Surprises, Credit Costs, and Economic Activity" (2015), Gertler and Karadi introduced an approach to identifying monetary policy shocks that uses high-frequency movements in interest rate futures around Federal Reserve announcements as external instruments in a structural vector autoregression. The method avoids the timing restrictions of conventional identification schemes and captures both surprises to the current policy rate and forward guidance about its future path. They found that a monetary tightening raises credit spreads, including term premia and the excess bond premium, and that these credit cost responses amplify the effect of policy on output and inflation well beyond what a standard model with only a short-rate channel would predict. The paper received the AEJ: Macroeconomics Best Paper Prize for 2015. The high-frequency external-instrument approach has become one of the standard methods for estimating the effects of monetary policy in empirical macroeconomics.

=== Labor markets and wage rigidity ===
With Antonella Trigari, Gertler developed a model of unemployment fluctuations in which wages are set by staggered multi-period Nash bargaining, so that new hires bargain against a backdrop of existing wage contracts. The resulting wage rigidity lets a search-and-matching model generate realistic volatility in unemployment and vacancies in response to productivity shocks. With Luca Sala and Trigari, he embedded this labor market structure in an estimated New Keynesian model. Later work with Christopher Huckfeldt and Trigari used matched employer-employee data to show that the high measured cyclicality of new-hire wages largely reflects composition effects from job-to-job movers, so that wages for new hires from unemployment are about as rigid as wages for existing workers. In a 2026 paper, the same authors revisited the role of temporary layoffs in the business cycle. They documented a destabilizing "loss-of-recall" effect, in which workers on temporary layoff lose their jobs permanently, and used a structural model to show that the Paycheck Protection Program generated sizable employment gains during the COVID-19 recession in part by reducing loss-of-recall.

=== Inflation dynamics ===
Gertler's early work on inflation, with Jordi Galí, estimated a structural New Keynesian Phillips curve using real marginal cost rather than the output gap as the driving variable and found that it fits U.S. inflation well.

His recent work returns to this question using firm-level data. With Luca Gagliardone, Simone Lenzu and Joris Tielens, he used quarterly micro data on prices and costs from Belgian manufacturing firms to estimate the slope of the marginal-cost-based Phillips curve from the bottom up. They found the slope to be several times steeper than conventional output-gap-based estimates, and argued that the apparent flatness of the standard Phillips curve reflects a weak link between output gaps and marginal costs rather than insensitivity of prices to costs. A companion paper examines how cost-price pass-through changes during inflation surges. With Gagliardone, he developed a quantitative New Keynesian model to assess how oil price shocks and the monetary policy response contributed to the 2021–2022 inflation surge, finding that both oil shocks and policy accommodation played important roles.

== Recognition ==
- Fellow of the Econometric Society (elected 1998)
- Named a Highly Cited Researcher by the Institute for Scientific Information
- Guggenheim Fellow (2007–2008)
- Clarivate Citation laureate in Economic Sciences (2009)
- Fellow of the American Academy of Arts and Sciences (elected 2010)
- AEJ: Macroeconomics Best Paper Prize (2015), with Peter Karadi
- Arrow Lectures, Stanford University (2019)
- BBVA Foundation Frontiers of Knowledge Award in Economics, Finance and Management (2020), shared with Ben Bernanke, Nobuhiro Kiyotaki and John Moore, for work on how financial market imperfections amplify macroeconomic fluctuations
- University Professor, New York University (2021)

== Selected publications ==
- Bernanke, Ben; Mark Gertler (1989). "Agency Costs, Net Worth, and Business Fluctuations". The American Economic Review. 79 (1): 14–31.
- Bernanke, Ben; Mark Gertler (1995). "Inside the Black Box: The Credit Channel of Monetary Policy Transmission". Journal of Economic Perspectives. 9 (4): 27–48. doi:10.1257/jep.9.4.27.
- Bernanke, Ben; Mark Gertler; Simon Gilchrist (1999). "The Financial Accelerator in a Quantitative Business Cycle Framework". Handbook of Macroeconomics. Vol. 1C. Elsevier.
- Clarida, Richard; Jordi Galí; Mark Gertler (1999). "The Science of Monetary Policy: A New Keynesian Perspective". Journal of Economic Literature. 37 (4): 1661–1707. doi:10.1257/jel.37.4.1661. hdl:10230/360.
- Galí, Jordi; Mark Gertler (1999). "Inflation Dynamics: A Structural Econometric Analysis". Journal of Monetary Economics. 44 (2): 195–222. doi:10.1016/S0304-3932(99)00023-9.
- Clarida, Richard; Jordi Galí; Mark Gertler (2000). "Monetary Policy Rules and Macroeconomic Stability: Evidence and Some Theory". Quarterly Journal of Economics. 115 (1): 147–180. doi:10.1162/003355300554692.
- Bernanke, Ben; Mark Gertler (2001). "Should Central Banks Respond to Movements in Asset Prices?". The American Economic Review. 91 (2): 253–257. doi:10.1257/aer.91.2.253.
- Gertler, Mark; Antonella Trigari (2009). "Unemployment Fluctuations with Staggered Nash Wage Bargaining". Journal of Political Economy. 117 (1): 38–86. doi:10.1086/597302.
- Gertler, Mark; Nobuhiro Kiyotaki (2010). "Financial Intermediation and Credit Policy in Business Cycle Analysis". Handbook of Monetary Economics. Vol. 3. Elsevier.
- Gertler, Mark; Peter Karadi (2011). "A Model of Unconventional Monetary Policy". Journal of Monetary Economics. 58 (1): 17–34. doi:10.1016/j.jmoneco.2010.10.004.
- Gertler, Mark; Peter Karadi (2015). "Monetary Policy Surprises, Credit Costs, and Economic Activity". American Economic Journal: Macroeconomics. 7 (1): 44–76. doi:10.1257/mac.20130329.
- Gertler, Mark; Nobuhiro Kiyotaki (2015). "Banking, Liquidity, and Bank Runs in an Infinite Horizon Economy". The American Economic Review. 105 (7): 2011–2043. doi:10.1257/aer.20130665.
- Gertler, Mark; Christopher Huckfeldt; Antonella Trigari (2020). "Unemployment Fluctuations, Match Quality, and the Wage Cyclicality of New Hires". Review of Economic Studies. 87 (4): 1876–1914. doi:10.1093/restud/rdaa004.
- Gagliardone, Luca; Mark Gertler; Simone Lenzu; Joris Tielens (2025). "Anatomy of the Phillips Curve: Micro Evidence and Macro Implications". The American Economic Review. 115 (11): 3941–3974. doi:10.1257/aer.20231569.
- Gertler, Mark; Christopher Huckfeldt; Antonella Trigari (2026). "Temporary Layoffs, Loss-of-Recall, and Cyclical Unemployment Dynamics". The American Economic Review. 116 (3): 862–896. doi:10.1257/aer.20220749. hdl:11565/4073176.
