= Credit channel =

The credit channel mechanism of monetary policy describes the theory that a central bank's policy changes affect the amount of credit that banks issue to firms and consumers for purchases, which in turn affects the real economy.

== Credit channel versus conventional monetary policy transmission mechanisms ==
Monetary policy transmission mechanisms describe how policy decisions are translated into effects on the real economy. Conventional monetary policy transmission mechanisms, such as the interest rate channel, focus on direct effects of monetary policy actions. The interest rate channel, for example, suggests that monetary policy makers use their leverage over nominal, short-term interest rates, such as the federal funds rate, to influence the cost of capital, and subsequently, purchases of durable goods and firm investment. Because prices are assumed to be sticky in the short-run, short-term interest rate changes affect the real interest rate. Changes in the real interest rate influence firm investment and household spending decisions on durable goods. These changes in investment and durable good purchases affect the level of aggregate demand and final production.

By contrast, the credit channel of monetary policy transmission is an indirect amplification mechanism that works in tandem with the interest rate channel. The credit channel affects the economy by altering the amount of credit firms and/or households have access to in equilibrium. Factors that reduce the availability of credit reduce agents' spending and investment, which leads to a reduction in output. In short, the main difference between the interest rate channel and the credit channel mechanism is how spending and investment decisions change due to monetary policy changes.

== How the credit channel works ==
The credit channel view posits that monetary policy adjustments that affect the short-term interest rate are amplified by endogenous changes in the external finance premium. The external finance premium is a wedge reflecting the difference in the cost of capital internally available to firms (i.e. retaining earnings) versus firms' cost of raising capital externally via equity and debt markets. External financing is more expensive than internal financing and the external finance premium will exist so long as external financing is not fully collateralized. Fully collateralized financing implies that even under the worst-case scenario the expected payoff of the project is at least sufficient to guarantee full loan repayment. In other words, full collateralization means that the firm who borrows for the project has enough internal funds relative to the size of the project that the lenders assume no risk. Contractionary monetary policy is thought to increase the size of the external finance premium, and subsequently, through the credit channel, reduce credit availability in the economy.

The external finance premium exists because of frictions—such as imperfect information or costly contract enforcement—in financial markets. The frictions prohibit efficient allocation of resources and result in dead-weight cost. For example, lenders may incur costs, also known as agency costs, to overcome the adverse selection problem that arises when evaluating the credit worthiness of borrowers. Adverse selection in this context refers to the notion that borrowers who need access to credit may be those who are least likely to be able to repay their debts. Additionally, lenders may incur a monitoring cost regarding the productive uses to which the borrowers have put the borrowed funds. In other words, if the ability to repay a loan used to finance a project is dependent on the project's success—either 'good' or 'bad' for simplicity—borrowers may have the incentive to claim the project was 'bad'. If the true value of the project is only known to the borrower, the lender must incur a monitoring or auditing cost in order to reveal the true project returns and receive full re-payment.

The size of the external finance premium that results from these market frictions may be affected by monetary policy actions. The credit channel—or, equivalently, changes in the external finance premium—can occur through two conduits: the balance sheet channel and the bank lending channel. The balance sheet channel refers to the notion that changes in interest rates affect borrowers' balance sheets and income statements. The bank lending channel refers to the idea that changes in monetary policy may affect the supply of loans disbursed by depository institutions.

=== Balance sheet channel ===
The balance sheet channel theorizes that the size of the external finance premium should be inversely related to the borrower's net worth. For example, the greater the net worth of the borrower, the more likely she may be to use self-financing as a means to fund investment. Higher net worth agents may have more collateral to put up against the funds they need to borrow, and thus are closer to being fully collateralized than low net worth agents. As a result, lenders assume less risk when lending to high-net-worth agents, and agency costs are lower. The cost of raising external funds should therefore be lower for high-net-worth agents.

Since the quality of borrowers' financial positions affect the terms of their credit, changes in financial positions should result in changes to their investment and spending decisions. This idea is closely related to the financial accelerator. A basic model of the financial accelerator suggests that a firm's spending on a variable input cannot exceed the sum of gross cash flows and net discounted value of assets. This relationship is expressed as a "collateral-in-advance" constraint. An increase in interest rates will tighten this constraint when it is binding; the firm's ability to purchase inputs will be reduced. This can occur in two ways: directly, via increasing interest payments on outstanding debt or floating-rate debt, and decreasing the value of the firm's collateral through decreased asset-prices typically associated with increased interest rates (reducing the net discounted value of the firm's assets); and indirectly, by reducing the demand for a firm's products, which reduces the firm's revenue while its short-run fixed cost do not adjust (lowering the firm's gross cash flow). The reduction in revenue relative to costs erodes the firm's net worth and credit-worthiness over time.

The balance sheet channel can also manifest itself via consumer spending on durables and housing. These types of goods tend to be illiquid in nature. If consumers need to sell off these assets to cover debts they may have to sell at a steep discount and incur losses. Consumers who hold more liquid financial assets such as cash, stocks, or bonds can more easily cope with a negative shock to their income. Consumer balance sheets with large portions of financial assets may estimate their probability of becoming financially distressed as low and are more willing to spend on durable goods and housing. Monetary policy changes that decrease the valuation of financial assets on consumers' balance sheets can result in lower spending on consumer durables and housing.

=== Bank lending channel ===
The bank lending channel theorizes that changes in monetary policy will shift the supply of intermediated credit, especially credit extended through commercial banks. The bank lending channel is essentially the balance sheet channel as applied to the operations of lending institutions. Monetary policy actions may affect the supply of loanable funds available to banks (i.e. a bank's liabilities), and consequently the total amount of loans they can make (i.e. a bank's assets). Banks serve to overcome informational problems in credit markets by acting as a screening agent for determining credit-worthiness. Thus many agents are dependent on banks to access credit markets. If the supply of loanable funds banks possess is affected by monetary policy changes, then so too should be the borrowers who are dependent on banks' funds for business operations. Firms reliant on bank credit may either be shut off from credit temporarily or incur additional search costs to find a different avenue through which to obtain credit. This will increase the external finance premium, consequently reducing real economic activity.

The bank lending channel presumes that monetary policy changes will drain bank deposits so long as banks cannot easily replace the short-fall in deposits by issuing other uninsured liabilities. The abolition of reserve requirements on certificates of deposit in the mid-1980s made it much easier for banks facing falling retail deposits to issue new liabilities not backed by reserve requirements. This is not to say that the bank lending channel is no longer relevant. On the contrary, the fact that banks can raise funds through liabilities that pay market interest rates exposes banks to an external finance premium as well. Forms of uninsured lending carry some credit risk relative to insured deposits. The cost of raising uninsured funds will reflect that risk, and will be more expensive for banks to purchase.

== Empirical evidence ==
The theory of a credit channel has been postulated as an explanation for a number of puzzling features of certain macroeconomic responses to monetary policy shocks, which the interest rate channel cannot fully explain. For example, Bernanke and Gertler (1995) describe 3 puzzles in the data:

1. The magnitude of changes in the real economy is large compared to the small changes in open-market interest rates due to monetary policy adjustments.
2. Key components of spending do not respond to interest changes immediately. In fact, they respond only after the interest rate effect has passed.
3. Monetary policy adjustments that affect short-term interest rates have large effects on variables that should respond to long-term interest rates (e.g. residential investment).

Since the credit channel operates as an amplification mechanism alongside the interest rate effect, small monetary policy changes can have large effects if the credit channel theory holds. Asset price boom and bust patterns in the 1980s may have led to the subsequent real fluctuations observed in many advanced economies. It has also been found that small firms, who are credit constrained relative to larger firms, respond to cash flow squeezes by cutting production and employment. Large firms, by contrast, respond to cash flow squeezes by increasing their short-term borrowing. Moreover, this empirical result still holds when controlling for industry characteristics and financial criteria. Recent research at the Federal Reserve suggests that the bank lending channel manifests itself through the mortgage lending market as well. Monetary policy tightening may force banks to shift from retail deposits insured by the Federal Deposit Insurance Corporation to uninsured managed liabilities if they wish to continue financing mortgages. These sources of funding are more expensive than deposits, raising the bank's average funding costs. Banks who lend heavily in sub-prime communities will face higher external finance premiums because the risk from holding assets composed largely of subprime borrowers is relatively high. As a result, banks have to raise funds through instruments that offer higher interest payments. The empirical evidence suggests that banks that lend heavily in subprime communities and rely mostly on retail deposits reduce mortgage issuance relative to other banks in the face of a monetary contraction. No evidence was found of reductions in mortgage lending initiating from other banks who do not lend heavily in subprime communities or who do not rely heavily on retail deposits in response to monetary policy tightening.

== See also ==
- Accelerator effect
- Financial accelerator
- Monetary policy
