= Joel Mokyr =

Economic historian (born 1946)

- יואל מוקיר
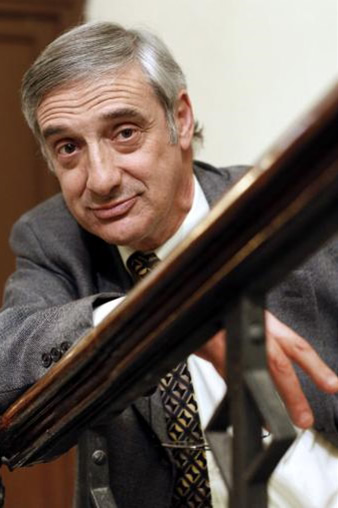
- Born: Joel Michael Mokyr; 26 July 1946 (age 80); Leiden, Netherlands
- Citizenship: American; Israeli
- Awards: Heineken Award for History (2006); Balzan Prize (2015); Nobel Prize in Economic Sciences (2025)

Academic background
- Education: Hebrew University of Jerusalem (BA); Yale University (MPhil, PhD)
- Thesis: Industrial Growth and Stagnation in the Low Countries, 1800–1850 (1974)

Academic work
- Discipline: Economic history
- Institutions: Northwestern University
- Doctoral students: Avner Greif, Ran Abramitzky, Mauricio Drelichman, Marlous van Waijenburg
- Main interests: Economic history of Europe
- Influenced: Cormac Ó Gráda

Joel Mokyr (Hebrew: יואל מוקיר; born 26 July 1946) is an American and Israeli economic historian and the Robert H. Strotz Professor of Arts and Sciences at Northwestern University. He is also a senior adjunct professor at the Eitan Berglas School of Economics at Tel Aviv University. He was awarded half a share of the Nobel Memorial Prize in Economic Sciences in 2025 "for having identified the prerequisites for sustained growth through technological progress."

== Early life and education ==
Joel Mokyr was born in Leiden, Netherlands, in 1946. He was born into a family of Dutch Jews who had survived the Holocaust. His father Salomon Mok, a civil servant, died of cancer when Mokyr was one year old. In 1955, he immigrated to Israel as a child with his mother Gonda Mok (née Jakobs), and grew up in Haifa. He received a B.A. in economics and history from the Hebrew University of Jerusalem in 1968. He then received an M.Phil. in economics from Yale University in 1972, and a Ph.D. in economics from Yale in 1974. His dissertation was titled Industrial Growth and Stagnation in the Low Countries, 1800–1850. A revised version was published in 1976 by Yale University Press.

== Career ==
Mokyr was an acting instructor at Yale University between 1972 and 1973, and became an assistant professor at Northwestern University in 1974, where he has remained ever since.

He has been the editor-in-chief of the Princeton Economic History of the Western World (a book series published by Princeton University Press), the Oxford Encyclopedia of Economic History (5 volumes, 2003), and was a co-editor of the Journal of Economic History. He was the President of the Economic History Association from 2002 to 2003.

== A Culture of Growth ==
Mokyr presents his explanations for the Industrial Revolution in the 2016 book A Culture of Growth: The Origins of the Modern Economy. The book has received positive reviews. Deirdre McCloskey described it as a "brilliant book... It's long, but consistently interesting, even witty. It sustains interest right down to page 337... The book is not beach reading. But you will finish it impressively learned about how we got to where we are in the modern world." In her review, McCloskey furthermore lauded Mokyr as a "Nobel-worthy economic scientist".

In a review published in Nature, Brad DeLong found that while he favored other explanations for the Industrial Revolution, "I would not be greatly surprised if I were wrong, and Mokyr's brief...turned out to be the most broadly correct analysis...A Culture of Growth is certainly making me rethink."

Cambridge economic historian Victoria Bateman wrote, "In pointing to growth-boosting factors that go beyond either the state or the market, Mokyr's book is very welcome. It could also feed into discussions about the scientific community post-Brexit. By reviving the focus on culture it will, however, prove controversial, particularly among economists." An article in The Economist pointed out that a fine definitional distinction had to be considered between "culture as ideas, socially learned" and "culture as inheritance transmitted genetically". The book has also been reviewed favorably by Diane Coyle, Foreign Affairs, The Independent, and the Journal of Economic Literature. Geoffrey Hodgson criticized the book for placing "too much explanatory weight" on "too few extraordinary people."

== Honours and awards ==
Mokyr was elected to the American Academy of Arts and Sciences in 1996, and was elected a Fellow of the Econometric Society in 2011. He was elected a foreign member of the Royal Netherlands Academy of Arts and Sciences in 2001, whose biennial Heineken Award for History he received in 2006. He is also a foreign member of the British Academy and the Accademia dei Lincei. He won the 2015 Balzan International Prize for economic history. He was elected a Distinguished Fellow by the American Economic Association in 2018. In 2021, he was named a Clarivate Citation laureate in Economic Sciences.

In 2025 Mokyr was awarded half of the Nobel Memorial Prize in Economic Sciences "for having identified the prerequisites for sustained growth through technological progress", the other half going to Philippe Aghion and Peter Howitt. The Nobel committee credited him with "demonstrat[ing] that if innovations are to succeed one another in a self-generating process, we not only need to know that something works, but we also need to have scientific explanations for why."

In 2026, the Carnegie Corporation of New York selected Mokyr for its annual Great Immigrants recognition.

== Personal life ==
Mokyr is married to Margalit (née Birnbaum), professor of Biochemistry and Molecular Biology at the University of Illinois Chicago. They have two daughters. He is an enthusiastic listener of Israeli classical music station Kol Hamusica.

Despite moving to Israel at age 9, he is still fluent in Dutch.

His late brother was Rob Mok, former advocate general in The Netherlands.

== Books ==
- —— (1976). Industrialization in the Low Countries, 1795–1850. New Haven: Yale University Press. ISBN 978-0-300-01892-9.
- —— (1985). Why Ireland Starved. London: Unwin Hyman. ISBN 978-0-04-941014-5. Revised edition.
- ——, ed. (1989). The Economics of the Industrial Revolution. Savage: Rowman & Littlefield Publishers. ISBN 978-0-86598-148-5.
- —— (1990). Twenty-Five Centuries of Technological Change: An Historical Survey. Chur, Switzerland: Taylor & Francis. ISBN 978-3-7186-4936-5.
- ——, ed. (1991). The Vital One: Essays in Honor of Jonathan Hughes. Greenwich, Conn.: JAI Press (NY). ISBN 978-1-55938-150-5.
- —— (1992). The Lever of Riches: Technological Creativity and Economic Progress. New York: Oxford Univ. Press. ISBN 978-0-19-506113-0.
- ——, ed. (1998). The British Industrial Revolution: An Economic Perspective. Boulder, Colo.: Westview Press. ISBN 0-8133-3389-X. Revised edition.
- Mokyr, Joel (2002). The Gifts of Athena: Historical Origins of the Knowledge Economy. Princeton N.J.: Princeton University Press. ISBN 978-0-691-09483-0.
- ——, ed. (2003). The Oxford Encyclopedia of Economic History. Oxford: Oxford University Press. ISBN 978-0-19-510507-0.
  - ——, ed. (2003). The Oxford Encyclopedia of Economic History. Vol. 1: Accounting and bookkeeping – Contract labor and the indenture system. Oxford: Oxford Univ. Press. ISBN 978-0-19-517090-0.
  - ——, ed. (2003). The Oxford Encyclopedia of Economic History. Vol. 2: Cooperative agriculture and farmer cooperatives – Hughes, Jonathan. Oxford: Oxford Univ. Press. ISBN 978-0-19-517091-7.
  - ——, ed. (2003). The Oxford Encyclopedia of Economic History. Vol. 3: Monte di Pietà – Spain. Oxford: Oxford Univ. Press. ISBN 978-0-19-517093-1.
  - ——, ed. (2003). The Oxford Encyclopedia of Economic History. Vol. 4: Slavery, U.S. to Unions, Labor. Oxford: Oxford University Press.
  - ——, ed. (2003). The Oxford Encyclopedia of Economic History. Vol. 5: Spices and spice trade, Zoos and other animal parks, Index. Oxford: Oxford Univ. Press. ISBN 978-0-19-517094-8.
- —— (2009). The Enlightened Economy: An Economic History of Britain 1700–1850. London: Penguin Books Ltd. ISBN 978-0-300-18951-3.
- Landes, David S.; Mokyr, Joel; Baumol, William J., eds. (2010). The Invention of Enterprise: Entrepreneurship from Ancient Mesopotamia to Modern Times. Princeton: Princeton University Press. ISBN 978-0-691-14370-5.
- Cruz, Laura; Mokyr, Joel, eds. (2010). The Birth of Modern Europe: Culture and Economy, 1400–1800. Leiden: BRILL. ISBN 978-90-04-18934-8.
- —— (2016). A Culture of Growth: Origins of the Modern Economy. Princeton: Princeton University Press. ISBN 978-0-691-16888-3.
- Ofer, Anita; —— (2017). Economics in the Test of Time: Issues in Economic History (in Hebrew). Raanana: Open University of Israel Press. ISBN 9789650615475. ISBN 9789650615505. Two volumes.
- Greif, Avner; ——; Tabellini, Guido (4 November 2025). Two Paths to Prosperity: Culture and Institutions in Europe and China, 1200–2000. Princeton University Press. ISBN 978-0-691-26594-0.

== See also ==
- List of Jewish Nobel laureates
- List of Israeli Nobel laureates
