= Avner Greif =

American economist

- Born: 1955 (age 70–71); Tel Aviv

Academic background
- Education: Northwestern University; Tel Aviv University
- Doctoral advisor: Joel Mokyr; John C. Panzar; William Rogerson

Academic work
- Discipline: Economic history
- School or tradition: New institutional economics
- Institutions: Stanford University

Avner Greif (/ɡraɪf/; born 1955) is an economics professor at Stanford University, Stanford, California. He holds a chaired professorship as Bowman Family Professor in the Humanities and Sciences.

Greif received his PhD in economics at Northwestern University, where Joel Mokyr acted as his supervisor, in 1989 and started his career at Stanford University in 1989. He received tenure in 1994. In 1998 he received a 'genius grant' from the MacArthur Foundation. His works deal with economic history and role of institutions in economic development, including analysis of trade in medieval Europe and Levant.

== Work ==
Greif specializes in the study of the social institutions that support economic development, and their history, incorporating game theory into his approach to this large subject. Greif is on the board of trustees of the International Society of New Institutional Economics.

Greif's research on informal institutions in development, particularly regarding traders in medieval Europe, has received significant praise from other economists. Among his research contributions is the view that during early stages of economic development, informal reputational mechanisms effectively substitute for formal contract enforcement regimes.

In Institutions and the Path to the Modern Economy: Lessons from Medieval Trade (2006), Greif argues that institutions play a central role in economic development:

Studying institutions sheds light on why some countries are rich and others poor, why some enjoy a welfare-enhancing political order and others do not. Socially beneficial institutions promote welfare-enhancing cooperation and action. They provide the foundations of markets by efficiently assigning, protecting, and altering property rights; securing contracts; and motivating specialization and exchange. Good institutions also encourage production by fostering saving, investment in human and physical capital, and development and adoption of useful knowledge. They maintain a sustainable rate of population growth and foster welfare-enhancing peace; the joint mobilization of resources; and beneficial policies, such as the provision of public goods. The quality of these institutional foundations of the economy and the polity is paramount in determining a society’s welfare. This is the case because individuals do not always recognize what will be socially beneficial nor are they motivated to pursue it effectively in the absence of appropriate institutions.

== Books ==
- Bates, Robert H.; ——; Levi, Margaret; Rosenthal, Jean-Laurent; Weingast, Barry R. (September 6, 1998). Analytic Narratives. Princeton University Press. ISBN 9780691216232.
- — (January 16, 2006). Institutions and the Path to the Modern Economy: Lessons from Medieval Trade. Cambridge University Press. ISBN 9780511791307.
- —; Mokyr, Joel; Tabellini, Guido (November 4, 2025). Two Paths to Prosperity: Culture and Institutions in Europe and China, 1000–2000. Princeton University Press. ISBN 978-0-691-26594-0.

== Selected publications ==
- Greif, Avner (1993). "Contract Enforceability and Economic Institutions in Early Trade: the Maghribi Traders' Coalition" (PDF). The American Economic Review. 83 (3): 525–48.
- Greif, Avner (1994). "Cultural Beliefs and the Organization of Society: A Historical and Theoretical Reflection on Collectivist and Individualist Societies" (PDF). The Journal of Political Economy. 102 (October 5): 912–50. doi:10.1086/261959. S2CID 153431326.
- Greif, Avner and David Laitin (2004). "A Theory of Endogenous Institutional Change" (PDF). American Political Science Review. 98 (4): 14–48. doi:10.1017/s0003055404041395. S2CID 1983672. SSRN 548363.
- Greif, Avner (2006). "Family Structure, Institutions, and Growth: The Origins and Implications of Western Corporations". American Economic Review. 96 (2): 308–312. doi:10.1257/000282806777212602. S2CID 17749879. SSRN 875008.
- Greif, Avner (2008). "Coercion and Exchange: How Did Markets Evolve?". SSRN 1304204.
- Greif, Avner and Steven Tadelis (2010). "A Theory of Moral Persistence: Crypto-Morality and Political Legitimacy". Journal of Comparative Economics. 38 (3): 229–244. doi:10.1016/j.jce.2010.07.005. SSRN 1638662.
- Greif, Avner and Guido Tabellini (2010). "Cultural and Institutional Bifurcation: China and Europe Compared". American Economic Review. 100 (2): 135–140. doi:10.1257/aer.100.2.135. SSRN 1532906.
- Greif, Avner, Murat Iyigun, and Diego L. Sasson (2011). "Risk, Institutions and Growth: Why England and Not China?". SSRN 1801664.
- Greif, Avner, Murat Iyigun, and Diego L. Sasson (2012). "Social Institutions and Economic Growth: Why England and Not China Became the First Modern Economy". SSRN 1783879. (This paper is an updated version of "Risk, Institutions and Growth: Why England and Not China?")
- Greif, Avner and Guido Tabellini (2015). "The Clan and the City: Sustaining Cooperation in China and Europe". SSRN 2101460.
- Dippel, Christian, Avner Greif, and Dan Trefler (2016). "The Rents From Trade and Coercive Institutions: Removing the Sugar Coating". SSRN 2864727.
- Desmet, Klaus, Avner Greif, and Stephen L. Parente (2017). "Spatial Competition, Innovation and Institutions: The Industrial Revolution and the Great Divergence". SSRN 2927147.
- Greif, Avner and Guido Tabellini (2017). "The Clan and the Corporation: Sustaining Cooperation in China and Europe" (PDF). Journal of Comparative Economics. 45 (1, Feb): 1–45. doi:10.1016/j.jce.2016.12.003. S2CID 46998982. SSRN 2565120.
