= BBVA Foundation Frontiers of Knowledge Award =

International award programme

The BBVA Foundation Frontiers of Knowledge Awards (Spanish: Premios Fundación BBVA Fronteras del Conocimiento) are an international award programme recognizing significant contributions in the areas of scientific research and cultural creation. The categories that make up the Frontiers of Knowledge Awards respond to the knowledge map of the present age. As well as the fundamental knowledge that is at their core, they address developments in information and communication technologies, and interactions between biology and medicine, ecology and conservation biology, climate change, economics, humanities and social sciences, and, finally, contemporary musical creation and performance. Specific categories are reserved for developing knowledge fields of critical relevance to confront central challenges of the 21st century, as in the case of the two environmental awards.

The awards were established in 2008, with the first set of winners receiving their prizes in 2009. The BBVA Foundation — belonging to financial group Banco Bilbao Vizcaya Argentaria — is partnered in the scheme by the Spanish National Research Council (CSIC), the country's premier public research organization.

== Details ==
There are eight award categories:

- Basic Science
- Biology and Biomedicine
- Climate Change
- Ecology and Conservation Biology
- Information and Communications Technologies
- Economics, Finance and Management
- Music and Opera
- Humanities and Social Sciences (Note: A new category in the 11th edition.)

Previously, in the first 10 editions, there was a category in development cooperation.

Eight juries, one for each category, analyze the nominations put forward by international academic and research institutions. To reach their decision, the juries meet during January and February in the Marqués de Salamanca Palace, Madrid headquarters of the BBVA Foundation. The day after the jury's decision, the name of the winners(s) and the achievements that earned them the award are revealed at an announcement event in the same location.

The awards are presented in June each year at a ceremony held, from the 11th edition, in the Euskalduna Palace at Bilbao, in the Basque Country.

== BBVA Foundation ==
The BBVA Foundation engages in the promotion of research, advanced training and the transmission of knowledge to society, focusing on the emerging issues of the 21st century in five areas: Environment, Biomedicine and Health, Economy and Society, Basic Sciences and Technology, and Arts and Humanities. The BBVA Foundation designs, develops and finances research projects in these areas; facilitates advanced specialist training through grants, courses, seminars and workshops; organizes award schemes for researchers and professionals whose work has contributed significantly to the advancement of knowledge; and communicates and disseminates such new knowledge through publications, databases, lecture series, debates, exhibitions and audiovisual and electronic media.

== Prizes ==
Each BBVA Foundation Frontiers of Knowledge laureate receives a commemorative artwork, a diploma and a cash prize of 400,000 euros per category. Awards may not be granted posthumously, and when an award is shared, its monetary amount is divided equally among the recipients.

The commemorative artwork is created by Madrid sculptor Blanca Muñoz, B.A. in Fine Arts from the Universidad Complutense de Madrid. Holder of scholarships at Calcografia Nazionale (1989), awarded by the Italian Government, at the Spanish Royal Academy in Rome (1990), and in Mexico City (1992), awarded by the Mexican Department of Foreign Affairs, her numerous distinctions include the 1999 National Print Prize.

As of 2023, 22 BBVA Foundation laureates have also won the Nobel Prize.

=== Laureates ===
Year	Category	Laureate	Nationality	Nobel Prize
2008	Basic Sciences	Ignacio Cirac	Spain	
2008	Basic Sciences	Peter Zoller	Austria	
2008	Biology and Biomedicine	Joan Massagué	Spain	
2008	Climate Change	Wallace S. Broecker	United States	
2008	Ecology and Conservation Biology	Thomas Lovejoy	United States	
2008	Ecology and Conservation Biology	William Laurance	United States	
2008	Information and Communication Technologies	Jacob Ziv	Israel	
2008	Economics, Finance and Management	Jean Tirole	France	Economic Sciences 2014
2008	Development Cooperation	Abdul Latif Jameel Poverty Action Lab	United States	
2008	Arts	Steven Holl	United States	
2009	Basic Sciences	Richard Zare	United States	
2009	Basic Sciences	Michael Fisher	United Kingdom	
2009	Biology and Biomedicine	Robert Lefkowitz	United States	Chemistry 2012
2009	Climate Change	Klaus Hasselmann	Germany	Physics 2021
2009	Ecology and Conservation Biology	Peter B. Reich	United States	
2009	Information and Communication Technologies	Thomas Kailath	United States	
2009	Economics, Finance and Management	Andreu Mas-Colell	Spain	
2009	Economics, Finance and Management	Hugo F. Sonnenschein	United States	
2009	Development Cooperation	Development Research Institute	United States	
2009	Contemporary Music	Cristóbal Halffter	Spain	
2010	Basic Sciences	Gabor A. Somorjai	United States Hungary	
2010	Biology and Biomedicine	Shinya Yamanaka	Japan	Physiology 2012
2010	Climate Change	Nicholas Stern	United Kingdom	
2010	Ecology and Conservation Biology	Edward Osborne Wilson	United States	
2010	Information and Communication Technologies	Donald Knuth	United States	
2010	Economics, Finance and Management	Lars Peter Hansen	United States	Economic Sciences 2013
2010	Development Cooperation	International Rice Research Institute (IRRI)	Finland	
2010	Contemporary Music	Helmut Lachenmann	Germany	
2011	Basic Sciences	Michel Mayor	Switzerland	Physics 2019
2011	Basic Sciences	Didier Queloz	Switzerland	Physics 2019
2011	Biology and Biomedicine	Alexander Varshavsky	United States	
2011	Climate Change	Isaac Held	United States	
2011	Ecology and Conservation Biology	Daniel H. Janzen	United States	
2011	Information and Communication Technologies	Carver Mead	United States	
2011	Economics, Finance and Management	Angus Deaton	United Kingdom	Economic Sciences 2015
2011	Development Cooperation	Ciro de Quadros	Brazil	
2011	Contemporary Music	Salvatore Sciarrino	Italy	
2012	Basic Sciences	Ingrid Daubechies	Belgium	
2012	Basic Sciences	David Mumford	United Kingdom	
2012	Biology and Biomedicine	Douglas Coleman	Canada	
2012	Biology and Biomedicine	Jeffrey Friedman	United States	
2012	Climate Change	Susan Solomon	United States	
2012	Ecology and Conservation Biology	Jane Lubchenco	United States	
2012	Information and Communication Technologies	Lotfi A. Zadeh	Azerbaijan	
2012	Economics, Finance and Management	Paul Milgrom	United States	Economic Sciences 2020
2012	Development Cooperation	DNDi	Switzerland	
2012	Contemporary Music	Pierre Boulez	France	
2013	Basic Sciences	Maximilian Haider	Austria	
2013	Basic Sciences	Harald Rose	Germany	
2013	Basic Sciences	Knut Urban	Germany	
2013	Biology and Biomedicine	Adrian Bird	United Kingdom	
2013	Climate Change	Christopher Field	United States	
2013	Ecology and Conservation Biology	Paul R. Ehrlich	United States	
2013	Information and Communication Technologies	Marvin Minsky	United States	
2013	Economics, Finance and Management	Elhanan Helpman	Israel	
2013	Development Cooperation	Pratham	India	
2013	Contemporary Music	Steve Reich	United States	
2014	Basic Sciences	Stephen Buchwald	United States	
2014	Biology and Biomedicine	Joseph Schlessinger	United States	
2014	Biology and Biomedicine	Charles Sawyers	United States	
2014	Biology and Biomedicine	Tony Hunter	United Kingdom	
2014	Climate Change	Richard Alley	United States	
2014	Ecology and Conservation Biology	David Tilman	United States	
2014	Information and Communication Technologies	Leonard Kleinrock	United States	
2014	Economics, Finance and Management	Richard Blundell	United Kingdom	
2014	Economics, Finance and Management	David Card	Canada	Economic Sciences 2021
2014	Development Cooperation	Helen Keller International	United States	
2014	Contemporary Music	György Kurtág	Hungary	
2015	Basic Sciences	Stephen Hawking	United Kingdom	
2015	Basic Sciences	Viatcheslav Mukhanov	Germany	
2015	Biology and Biomedicine	Edward Boyden	United States	
2015	Biology and Biomedicine	Karl Deisseroth	United States	
2015	Biology and Biomedicine	Gero Miesenböck	Austria	
2015	Climate Change	Veerabhadran Ramanathan	India	
2015	Ecology and Conservation Biology	Ilkka Hanski	Finland	
2015	Information and Communication Technologies	Stephen Cook	Canada	
2015	Economics, Finance and Management	Robert Wilson	United States	Economic Sciences 2020
2015	Development Cooperation	Martin Ravallion	Australia	
2015	Contemporary Music	Georges Aperghis	Greece	
2016	Basic Sciences	David Cox	United Kingdom	
2016	Basic Sciences	Bradley Efron	United States	
2016	Biology and Biomedicine	Emmanuelle Charpentier	France	Chemistry 2020
2016	Biology and Biomedicine	Jennifer Doudna	United States	Chemistry 2020
2016	Biology and Biomedicine	Francisco Mojica	Spain	
2016	Climate Change	James Hansen	United States	
2016	Climate Change	Syukuro Manabe	Japan / United States	Physics 2021
2016	Ecology and Conservation Biology	Gene E. Likens	United States	
2016	Ecology and Conservation Biology	Marten Scheffer	Netherlands	
2016	Information and Communication Technologies	Geoffrey Hinton	United Kingdom	Physics 2024
2016	Economics, Finance and Management	Daron Acemoglu	Turkey / United States	Economic Sciences 2024
2016	Development Cooperation	Peter J. Myler	United States	
2016	Development Cooperation	Pedro L. Alonso	Spain	
2016	Contemporary Music	Sofia Gubaidulina	Russia	
2017	Basic Sciences	Omar M. Yaghi	Jordan / United States	Chemistry 2025
2017	Biology and Biomedicine	James P. Allison	United States	Medicine 2018
2017	Climate Change	William Nordhaus	United States	Economic Sciences 2018
2017	Ecology and Conservation Biology	Rosemary Grant	United Kingdom	
2017	Ecology and Conservation Biology	Peter Grant	United Kingdom	
2017	Information and Communication Technologies	Shafi Goldwasser	United States	
2017	Information and Communication Technologies	Ronald Rivest	United States	
2017	Information and Communication Technologies	Silvio Micali	Italy	
2017	Information and Communication Technologies	Adi Shamir	Israel	
2017	Economics, Finance and Management	Robert Porter	Canada	
2017	Economics, Finance and Management	Ariel Pakes	Canada / United States	
2017	Economics, Finance and Management	Timothy Bresnahan	United States	
2017	Development Cooperation	Nubia Muñoz	Colombia	
2017	Contemporary Music	Kaija Saariaho	Finland	
2018	Basic Sciences	Charles L. Kane	United States	
2018	Basic Sciences	Eugene J. Mele	United States	
2018	Biology and Biomedicine	Jeffrey I. Gordon	United States	
2018	Climate Change	Anny Cazenave	France	
2018	Climate Change	John A. Church	Australia	
2018	Climate Change	Jonathan M. Gregory	United Kingdom	
2018	Ecology and Conservation Biology	Gretchen Daily	United States	
2018	Ecology and Conservation Biology	Georgina Mace	United Kingdom	
2018	Information and Communication Technologies	Ivan Sutherland	United States	
2018	Economics, Finance and Management	Claudia Goldin	United States	Economic Sciences 2023
2018	Humanities and Social Sciences	Noam Chomsky	United States	
2018	Music and Opera	John Adams	United States	
2019	Basic Sciences	Gilles Brassard	Canada	
2019	Basic Sciences	Charles H. Bennett	United States	
2019	Basic Sciences	Peter Shor	United States	
2019	Biology and Biomedicine	Michael N. Hall	United States / Switzerland	
2019	Biology and Biomedicine	David M. Sabatini	United States	
2019	Climate Change	Kerry A. Emanuel	United States	
2019	Ecology and Conservation Biology	Daniel Pauly	Canada	
2019	Ecology and Conservation Biology	Terence Hughes	Ireland / Australia	
2019	Ecology and Conservation Biology	Carlos M. Duarte	Spain	
2019	Information and Communications Technology	Isabelle Guyon	France	
2019	Information and Communications Technology	Bernhard Schölkopf	Germany	
2019	Information and Communications Technology	Vladimir Vapnik	Russia / United States	
2019	Economics, Finance and Management	Philippe Aghion	France	Economic Sciences 2025
2019	Economics, Finance and Management	Peter W. Howitt	Canada	Economic Sciences 2025
2019	Humanities and Social Cognition	Susan Fiske	United States	
2019	Humanities and Social Cognition	Shelley E. Taylor	United States	
2019	Music and Opera	Arvo Pärt	Estonia	
2020	Basic Sciences	Paul Alivisatos	United States	
2020	Basic Sciences	Michael Grätzel	Switzerland	
2020	Biology and Biomedicine	David Julius	United States	Medicine 2021
2020	Biology and Biomedicine	Ardem Patapoutian	Lebanon / United States	Medicine 2021
2020	Climate Change	Neil Adger	United Kingdom	
2020	Climate Change	Ian Burton	United Kingdom	
2020	Climate Change	Karen O'Brien	United States	
2020	Ecology and Conservation Biology	Sandra Díaz	Argentina	
2020	Ecology and Conservation Biology	Sandra Lavorel	France	
2020	Ecology and Conservation Biology	Mark Westoby	Australia	
2020	Information and Communications Technology	John L. Hennessy	United States	
2020	Information and Communications Technology	David A. Patterson	United States	
2020	Economics, Finance and Management	Ben Bernanke	United States	Economic Sciences 2022
2020	Economics, Finance and Management	Mark Gertler	United States	
2020	Economics, Finance and Management	Nobuhiro Kiyotaki	Japan	
2020	Economics, Finance and Management	John Moore	United Kingdom	
2020	Humanities and Social Sciences	Gerald Holton	Austria / United States	
2020	Music and Opera	Peter Eötvös	Hungary	
2021	Basic Sciences	Charles Fefferman	United States	
2021	Basic Sciences	Jean-François Le Gall	France	
2021	Biology and Biomedicine	Katalin Kariko	Hungary	Medicine 2023
2021	Biology and Biomedicine	Drew Weissman	United States	Medicine 2023
2021	Biology and Biomedicine	Robert S. Langer	United States	
2021	Climate Change	Lonnie G. Thompson	United States	
2021	Climate Change	Ellen Mosley-Thompson	United States	
2021	Ecology and Conservation Biology	Lenore Fahrig	Canada	
2021	Ecology and Conservation Biology	Simon Levin	United States	
2021	Ecology and Conservation Biology	Steward Pickett	United States	
2021	Information and Communications Technology	Judea Pearl	Israel / United States	
2021	Economics, Finance and Management	Matthew O. Jackson	United States	
2021	Humanities and Social Sciences	Mark Granovetter	United States	
2021	Music and Opera	Philip Glass	United States	
2022	Basic Sciences	Paul Corkum	Canada	
2022	Basic Sciences	Ferenc Krausz	Hungary / Germany	Physics 2023
2022	Basic Sciences	Anne L’Huillier	France / Sweden	Physics 2023
2022	Biology and Biomedicine	David Baker	United States	Chemistry 2024
2022	Biology and Biomedicine	John Jumper	United States	Chemistry 2024
2022	Biology and Biomedicine	Demis Hassabis	United Kingdom	Chemistry 2024
2022	Climate Change	Ellen Thomas	United States	
2022	Climate Change	James Zachos	United States	
2022	Ecology and Conservation Biology	Susan Alberts	United States	
2022	Ecology and Conservation Biology	Jeanne Altmann	United States	
2022	Ecology and Conservation Biology	Marlene Zuk	United States	
2022	Information and Communications Technology	Alberto Sangiovanni-Vincentelli	Italy / United States	
2022	Economics, Finance and Management	Timothy J. Besley	United Kingdom	
2022	Economics, Finance and Management	Torsten Persson	Sweden	
2022	Economics, Finance and Management	Guido Tabellini	Italy	
2022	Humanities and Social Sciences	Steven Pinker	Canada	
2022	Humanities and Social Sciences	Peter Singer	Australia	
2022	Music and Opera	Thomas Adès	United Kingdom	
2023	Basic Sciences	Claire Voisin	France	
2023	Basic Sciences	Yakov Eliashberg	United States	
2023	Biology and Biomedicine	Franz-Ulrich Hartl	Germany	
2023	Biology and Biomedicine	Arthur L. Horwich	United States	
2023	Biology and Biomedicine	Kazutoshi Mori	Japan	
2023	Biology and Biomedicine	Peter Walter	United States	
2023	Climate Change	Dorthe Dahl-Jensen	Denmark	
2023	Climate Change	Jean Jouzel	France	
2023	Climate Change	Valérie Masson-Delmotte	France	
2023	Climate Change	Jakob Schwander	Switzerland	
2023	Climate Change	Thomas Stocker	Switzerland	
2023	Ecology and Conservation Biology	Gerardo Ceballos	Mexico	
2023	Ecology and Conservation Biology	Rodolfo Dirzo	Mexico	
2023	Information and Communication Technologies	Takeo Kanade	Japan	
2023	Economics, Finance and Management	Partha Dasgupta	India / United Kingdom	
2023	Humanities and Social Sciences	Elke U. Weber	United States	
2023	Music and Opera	George Benjamin	United Kingdom	
2024	Basic Sciences	Avelino Corma	Spain	
2024	Basic Sciences	John F. Hartwig	United States	
2024	Basic Sciences	Helmut Schwarz	Germany	
2024	Biology and Biomedicine	Daniel Joshua Drucker	Canada	
2024	Biology and Biomedicine	Joel F. Habener	United States	
2024	Biology and Biomedicine	Jens Juul Holst	Denmark	
2024	Biology and Biomedicine	Svetlana Mojsov	North Macedonia / United States	
2024	Climate Change	Camille Parmesan	United States	
2024	Information and Communication Technologies	Anil Jain	India / United States	
2024	Information and Communication Technologies	Michael I. Jordan	United States	
2024	Economics, Finance and Management	Olivier Blanchard	France / United States	
2024	Economics, Finance and Management	Jordi Gali	Spain	
2024	Economics, Finance and Management	Michael Dean Woodford	United States	Economic Sciences 2026
2024	Humanities	Philip Kitcher	United States	
2024	Social Sciences	Icek Ajzen	Poland / United States	
2024	Social Sciences	Dolores Albarracín	Argentina / United States	
2024	Social Sciences	Mahzarin Banaji	India / United States	
2024	Social Sciences	Anthony Greenwald	United States	
2024	Social Sciences	Richard E. Petty	United States	
2024	Music and Opera	Toshio Hosokawa	Japan	
2025	Basic Sciences	Allan H. MacDonald	Canada	
2025	Basic Sciences	Pablo Jarillo-Herrero	Spain	
2025	Biology and Biomedicine	Carl June	United States	
2025	Biology and Biomedicine	Michel Sadelain	France	
2025	Climate Change	Carl Wunsch	United States	
2025	Information and Communication Technologies	Joan Daemen	Belgium	
2025	Information and Communication Technologies	Vincent Rijmen	Belgium	
2025	Economics, Finance and Management	Charles F. Manski	United States	
2025	Humanities	Nancy Cartwright	United States / United Kingdom	
2025	Social Sciences	University of Michigan Institute for Social Research	United States	
2025	Social Sciences	NORC at the University of Chicago	United States	
2025	Music and Opera	Unsuk Chin	South Korea	

=== Laureates per country ===
Below is a chart of all laureates per country (updated to included 2025 laureates). Some laureates are counted more than once if they have multiple citizenships.

Country	Number of laureates
United States	119
United Kingdom	21
Canada	13
France	10
Spain	9
Germany	8
Japan	6
Hungary	5
India	5
Austria	4
Israel	4
Italy	3
Sweden	3
Russia	2
Argentina	2
Belgium	2

== See also ==
- Lists of awards
