= Action Institute =

Italy-based think tank

Action Institute is an independent, non-partisan and non-profit think tank, created in 2012 as civic response to the urgent social and economic crisis that hit Italy in 2007. Action Institute defines itself as the first "Action Tank” because its aim is to go beyond the traditional concept of research center and elaborate practical, feasible and high impact ("actionable") policy recommendations to create impact towards sustaining the competitiveness of Italy as a country. Action Institute is composed of distinguished professionals who contribute to the policy proposals elaboration on a pro bono manner.

== History ==
Action Institute was founded in 2012 by a group of distinguished professionals and academics led by Carlotta de Franceschi, and by a scientific committee composed of Alberto Alesina (Harvard University), Alfonso Gambardella (Bocconi University), Guido Tabellini (Bocconi University) and the recipient of the 2001 Nobel Memorial Prize in Economic Sciences Michael Spence (New York University). Action Institute's organizational structure consists of a steering committee, an operating group and four interdisciplinary working groups, organized by scientific area: credit, health, innovation and human capital. The working groups of Action Institute are typically composed of professionals with remarkable track records in their respective field of activity, and with noticeable international careers (for example, CEOs, partners, divisional heads, heads of public sector institutions and professors). Since its establishment, the media recognized the novelty of Action Institute and institutions, praising the solid pragmatic orientation, the interdisciplinary approach, the international perspective and the high degree of innovation that characterizes its proposals. The international network of Action Institute currently accounts members in Milan, Rome, London and New York.

== Mission and values ==
The Mission of Action Institute is to elaborate innovative and "actionable" policy solutions and to create the conditions for these solutions to generate the expected impact. In pursuing its mission, Action Institute relies on a confrontational method, encouraging its members to work together and bring their expertise to formulate cutting-edge policy proposals, and to put themselves at the service of relevant institutions, in order to create viable implementation paths for the proposals. Action Institute follows four core principles: Value, Independence, Dialogue, Impact.
