= Assar Lindbeck Medal =

The Assar Lindbeck Medal is a bi-annual award given to the economist(s) in Sweden under the age of 45 whose work have gained the most international recognition. The award is named in honor of Assar Lindbeck.

== Recipients ==
Year	Recipients	Institution	Alma mater (PhD or equivalent)
2007	Tore Ellingsen	Stockholm School of Economics	The London School of Economics
2009	David Strömberg and Jakob Svensson	Institute for International Economic Studies	David Strömberg — Princeton University; Jakob Svensson — Stockholm University
2011	Per Strömberg	Chicago Booth School of Business / Stockholm School of Economics	Carnegie Mellon University (PhD)
2013	Mariassunta Giannetti	Stockholm School of Economics	University of California, Los Angeles (UCLA)
2015	Oskar Nordström Skans	Uppsala University	Uppsala University
2017	Petter Lundborg	Lund University	Lund University
2019	Anna Dreber Almenberg	Stockholm School of Economics	Stockholm School of Economics
2021	Erik Lindqvist and Robert Östling	Swedish Institute for Social Research & Stockholm School of Economics	Robert Östling — Stockholm School of Economics; Erik Lindqvist — Stockholm School of Economics
2023	Olle Folke and Johanna Rickne	Swedish Institute for Social Research	Johanna Rickne — Uppsala University; Olle Folke — IIES, Stockholm University
2025	Konrad Burchardi	Institute for International Economic Studies	The London School of Economics

== See also ==
- List of economics awards
- John Bates Clark Medal
- Yrjö Jahnsson Award
- Nakahara Prize
- Gossen Prize
