= Interest rate channel =

Interest rate effects on the wider economy

The interest rate channel is a mechanism of monetary policy, whereby a policy-induced change in the short-term nominal interest rate by the central bank affects the price level, and subsequently output and employment.

== How the interest rate channel works ==
While the central bank aims to control short term nominal interest rates (such as the federal funds rate in the United States), the overall economy is primarily affected by the long-term real interest rates charged by commercial banks to their customers. The interest rate channel focuses on how changes in the central bank's policy rate affect various commercial interest rates including forex.

The interest rate channel posits that an increase in the short-term nominal interest rate leads first to an increase in longer-term nominal interest rates. This is described by the expectation hypothesis of the term structure.

In turn, this affects the real interest rate and the cost of capital, because prices are assumed to be sticky in the short-run. So an important aspect of this mechanism is the emphasis on the real, rather than the nominal, interest rate, which affects consumer and business decisions.

Accordingly, a decline in the long-term real interest rate reduces both the cost of borrowing, and the money paid on interest-bearing deposits, therefore encouraging household spending on durable goods as well as investments by corporations. This rise in investments and durable good purchases boosts the level of aggregate demand and employment. This transmission mechanism is characterized by the following diagram of monetary expansion:

M↑ ⇒ i_{r}↓ ⇒ I↑ ⇒ Y↑

Where M↑ represents an expansionary monetary policy which leads to a decrease in the real interest rate (i_{r}↓), which in turn lowers the cost of capital. This causes a rise in investment spending and consumer durable expenditure I↑, thereby leading to a rise in aggregate demand and an increase in output Y↑.

== Monetary policy implications ==
The interest rate channel plays a key role in the transmission of monetary impulses to the real economy. The central bank of a major country is, in principle, able to trigger expansionary and restrictive effects in the real economy, by varying the federal funds rate and hence the short-term nominal interest rate. However, it is difficult to explain how, with this channel, a central bank might target a relatively stable and low inflation rate of a longer time period.

Although changes in the central bank's policy interest rate can affect commercial interest rates quite quickly, there can be a significant lag before those changes influence spending and saving decisions, in turn having an impact on overall output.

== Taylor rule ==
Taylor has a study on the interest rate channel, and he shows that there is strong empirical evidence for significant interest rate effects on consumer expenditure and investments, making the interest-rate monetary transmission mechanism strong.

The Taylor Rule describes the central bank interest rate as a function of inflation, and a measure of economic activity. More precisely, the target federal funds rate equals the long term real interest rate, plus the current inflation rate, plus coefficients multiplied by the deviations between real and target inflation and the deviations between real and potential output. This rule can serve as a device for policy decisions when the goal of the central bank is to achieve price stability. For example, when the inflation rate exceeds its target, the rule recommends an increase in the interest rate.

== Criticisms ==
Despite the Taylor rule, some researchers, Bernanke and Gertler for example, had difficulty in their empirical studies identifying significant effects of interest rate through the costs of capital. Another issue economists have is with the assumption that monetary policy has its strongest influence on short-term interest rates, such as the federal funds rate. Since this rate is an overnight rate, monetary policy has a relatively weaker impact on the real long-term rate and hence on the purchases of durable assets. Finally, this mechanism neglects the credit business of the banking system.

This shortcoming provided the stimulus for other transmission mechanisms of monetary policy, especially the credit channel. This channel should not be seen as a separate, free-standing alternative to the interest rate mechanism, but rather as a set of factors that strengthen and transmit the interest rate effects.

== See also ==
- Credit channel
- Quantity theory
- Monetary policy
