= Peter J. Myler =

Peter John Myler is a biochemist, medical researcher and educator. He is professor, principal investigator, and supervisor at the Center for Global Infectious Disease Research in Seattle, Washington.

== Education ==
Myler earned both his Bachelor of Science degree and his PhD in biochemistry (in 1982), at the University of Queensland in Australia.

== Career ==
In 1993, Myler became an assistant professor in pathobiology at the University of Washington. At the University of Washington's Department of Global Health, he is an affiliate professor, both with Global Health and with Biomedical Informatics and Medical Education.

His research focuses on genome-scale technologies (next-generation sequencing, mRNA profiling and proteomics), bioinformatics and molecular approaches to study gene function and protein structure in infectious disease organisms. His laboratory works to discover novel drug and vaccine strategies against global infectious diseases. Some of his research integrated aspects of molecular biology with epidemiological and clinical concerns, including species of the pathogens Trypanosoma and Leishmania.

== Selected publications ==
- Myler, Peter J.; Fasel, Nicolas J., eds. (2008). Leishmania: After the Genome. Caister Academic Press Limited. ISBN 978-1-904455-28-8.
- El-Sayed, Najib M.; Myler, Peter J.; Bartholomeu, Daniella C.; Nilsson, Daniel (2005-07-15). "The genome sequence of Trypanosoma cruzi, etiologic agent of Chagas disease". Science. 309 (5733): 409–15. Bibcode:2005Sci...309..409E. doi:10.1126/science.1112631. hdl:11336/80500. PMID 16020725.
- Ivens, Alasdair C.; Peacock, Christopher S.; Worthey, Elizabeth A.; Murphy, Lee; et al. (2005-07-15). "The genome of the kinetoplastid parasite, Leishmania major". Science. 309 (5733): 436–42. Bibcode:2005Sci...309..436I. doi:10.1126/science.1112680. PMC 1470643. PMID 16020728.
- Aslett, Martin; Aurrecoechea, Cristina; Berriman, Matthew; Brestelli, John; et al. (January 2010). "TriTrypDB: a functional genomic resource for the Trypanosomatidae". Nucleic Acids Research. 38 (Database issue): D457–62. doi:10.1093/nar/gkp851. PMC 2808979. PMID 19843604.
- El-Sayed, Najib M.; Myler, Peter J.; Blandin, Gaëlle; Berriman, Matthew (2005-07-15). "Comparative genomics of trypanosomatid parasitic protozoa". Science. 309 (5733): 404–409. Bibcode:2005Sci...309..404E. doi:10.1126/science.1112181. PMID 16020724.
- Yamada, Shinya; Hatta, Masato; Staker, Bart L.; Watanabe, Shinji; et al. (2010-08-05). "Biological and structural characterization of a host-adapting amino acid in influenza virus". PLOS Pathogens. 6 (8) e1001034. doi:10.1371/journal.ppat.1001034. PMC 2916879. PMID 20700447.
- Martínez-Calvillo, Santiago; Yan, Shaofeng; Nguyen, Dan; Fox, Mark; et al. (May 2003). "Transcription of Leishmania major Friedlin chromosome 1 initiates in both directions within a single region". Molecular Cell. 11 (5): 1291–1299. doi:10.1016/s1097-2765(03)00143-6. PMID 12769852.
- Myler, Peter J.; Audleman, Lindsey; deVos, Theo; Hixson, Greg (1999-03-16). "Leishmania major Friedlin Chromosome 1 Has an Unusual Distribution of Protein-Coding Genes". Proceedings of the National Academy of Sciences of the United States of America. 96 (6): 2902–2906. Bibcode:1999PNAS...96.2902M. doi:10.1073/pnas.96.6.2902. PMC 15867. PMID 10077609.
- Stuart, Kenneth D.; Weeks, Reitha; Guilbride, Lys; Myler, Peter J. (1992-09-15). "Molecular organization of Leishmania RNA virus 1". Proceedings of the National Academy of Sciences of the United States of America. 89 (18): 8596–8600. Bibcode:1992PNAS...89.8596S. doi:10.1073/pnas.89.18.8596. PMC 49967. PMID 1382295.
- Martínez-Calvillo, Santiago; Nguyen, Dan; Stuart, Kenneth; Myler, Peter J. (April 2004). "Transcription Initiation and Termination on Leishmania major Chromosome 3". Eukaryotic Cell. 3 (2): 506–517. doi:10.1128/EC.3.2.506-517.2004. PMC 387636. PMID 15075279.

== Honors and awards ==
Myler received the BBVA Foundation Frontiers of Knowledge Award for Development Cooperation, 2016.
