= Mariassunta Giannetti =

Economist

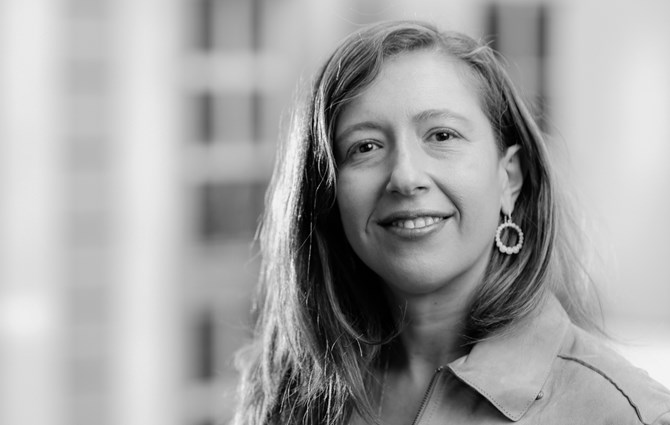
Mariassunta Gianetti

Mariassunta Giannetti is an economist and a professor of finance at the Stockholm School of Economics. She won the Assar Lindbeck Medal in 2013.

She is an associate editor of The Journal of Finance and the Journal of Financial Economics since 2021, and she was an associate editor of The Review of Financial Studies, the Review of Finance and the Journal of Banking and Finance. She is a research fellow at CEPR and the European Academic Director of the Financial Management Association (FMA).

She obtained her Ph.D. in economics from the University of California, Los Angeles and a B.A. and M.Sc. from Bocconi University.

== Research ==
Giannetti's research mainly focuses on corporate finance, international finance and financial intermediation. She has published in the Journal of Political Economy, the American Economic Review, The Journal of Finance, the Journal of Financial Economics and the Journal of Financial and Quantitative Analysis. Her research has been quoted over 5800 times according to google scholar. She is the 91st most influential woman in economics according to IDEAS.

Her research has been quoted in Bloomberg The Japan Times, and the Frankfurter Allgemeine Zeitung. She has been awarded many prestigious international prizes such as the Review of Finance Pagano - Zechner Prize, the NYU Stern / Imperial / Fordham Rising Star in Finance award, as well as the Sun Yefang Financial Innovation Award, the ECGI Standard Life Investments Finance Prize, and the Assar Lindbeck Medal. She has received the Journal of Financial Intermediation best paper award, the ECB Duisenberg Fellowship, and the Stockholm School of Economics Annual Research award too.

=== Selected bibliography ===
- Giannetti, Mariassunta (2003). "Do Better Institutions Mitigate Agency Problems? Evidence from Corporate Finance Choices". The Journal of Financial and Quantitative Analysis. 38 (1): 185.
- Giannetti, Mariassunta; Laeven, Luc (2012-04-01). "The flight home effect: Evidence from the syndicated loan market during financial crises". Journal of Financial Economics. 104 (1): 23–43.
- Giannetti, Mariassunta; Simonov, Andrei (2006). "Which Investors Fear Expropriation? Evidence from Investors' Portfolio Choices". The Journal of Finance. 61 (3): 1507–1547.
- Giannetti, Mariassunta; Laeven, Luc (2012). "Flight Home, Flight Abroad, and International Credit Cycles". American Economic Review. 102 (3): 219–224.
