= Tore Ellingsen =

Norwegian economist

- Born: 3 June 1962 (age 64)

Academic background
- Education: London School of Economics; Norwegian School of Economics
- Doctoral advisor: John Hardman Moore

Academic work
- Discipline: Monetary economics
- Institutions: Stockholm School of Economics
- Awards: Assar Lindbeck Medal (2007)
- Website: Information at IDEAS / RePEc

Tore Ellingsen (born 3 June 1962) is a Norwegian economist active in Sweden.

Ellingsen graduated as siviløkonom from Norwegian School of Economics in Bergen in 1985, and received a Ph.D. from London School of Economics in 1991. Since 1991 he is active at the Stockholm School of Economics, from 1996 as docent (associate professor) and from 2000 as professor of economics. Ellingsen was the first recipient of the Assar Lindbeck Medal.

Ellingsen was elected a foreign member of the Royal Swedish Academy of Sciences in 2004. Since 2007 he is a member of the Prize Committee for the Sveriges Riksbank Prize in Economic Sciences in Memory of Alfred Nobel, where he was an adjunct member 2005–2007. He is also a fellow of the European Economic Association.
