= Samuel Brittan =

English journalist and author (1933–2020)

Sir Samuel Brittan (29 December 1933 – 12 October 2020) was an English journalist and author. He was the first economics correspondent for the Financial Times, and later a long-time columnist. He was a member of the Academic Advisory Council of the Global Warming Policy Foundation.

== Early life ==
Samuel Brittan was born in London to Rebecca (Lipetz) and Joseph Brittan, a doctor. His parents were Lithuanian Jews who had migrated to Britain before World War II. He was the elder brother of Leon Brittan, who was Home Secretary under Margaret Thatcher. Malcolm Rifkind, his cousin, was the Secretary of State for Scotland, also inside the Margaret Thatcher government.

== Education ==
Brittan was educated at Kilburn Grammar School, a former state grammar school in Kilburn in the London Borough of Brent in north-west London, followed by Jesus College, Cambridge, where he was taught by Peter Bauer in his first year, Milton Friedman in his second year, and Harry Gordon Johnson in his third year. Brittan gained a first class degree.

Brittan wrote of being supervised by Johnson:

In my third year I was supervised by Harry Johnson, who was a genuine prodigy – on the surface flashy and Americanized – and not yet the feared economic personality he later became. He was the supervisor from whom I probably derived the most benefit.

On his relationship with Friedman at Cambridge Brittan said that he "proved a charming person; but at first I did not like being tutored by a far-out Republican and missing the true Cambridge Keynesian wisdom" – recalling how the American economist dealt him "one of best put-down remarks I have ever encountered":

[Friedman] mentioned to me a letter he had received from Arthur Burns saying that Eisenhower was turning out well as President. I expressed surprise, to which Friedman responded: "First, Burns has much better knowledge of Eisenhower. Second, given equal knowledge I would prefer his opinion to yours." Against The Flow (2005)

== Career ==
In 1961, Brittan was appointed economics editor at The Observer until 1964 and in 1965 was appointed as an advisor at the Department of Economic Affairs. Then in 1966 he was appointed as an economic commentator at the Financial Times.

In March 1981, when 364 leading economists wrote a letter to The Times criticising Margaret Thatcher's economic policy, Brittan was one of the few commentators to openly defend the Conservative government's policy. He was a member of the Peacock Committee on the Finance of the BBC from 1985 to 1986.

Brittan received an Honorary Doctorate from Heriot-Watt University in 1985

Brittan was awarded the Orwell, Senior Harold Wincott and Ludwig Erhard prizes. In 1993, Brittan was knighted 'for services to economic journalism'. He was the brother of Leon Brittan, who served as Thatcher's Chief Secretary to the Treasury, Home Secretary and President of the Board of Trade, and then as a European Commissioner. He and Leon were cousins of Malcolm Rifkind, who served as Scottish Secretary, Transport Secretary, Defence Secretary and Foreign Secretary under Thatcher and John Major; all three were cousins once removed of producer Mark Ronson. Brittan was awarded an honorary doctorate by the University of Essex in 1994.

Brittan was a supporter of the land value tax ideas of Henry George.

Brittan stated that he was always an "individualist liberal".

Brittan died on 12 October 2020 at the age of 86.

== Publications ==
- Samuel Brittan, The Treasury under the Tories, 1951–64 (Secker & Warburg, 1964).
- Samuel Brittan, Left or Right: The Bogus dilemma (Secker & Warburg, 1968).
- Samuel Brittan, Capitalism and the Permissive Society (Macmillan, 1973).
- Samuel Brittan, The Economic Consequences of Democracy (Temple Smith, 1977).
- Samuel Brittan, A Restatement of Economic Liberalism (Macmillan, 1988).
- Samuel Brittan, Capitalism With A Human Face (Edward Elgar, 1995).
- Samuel Brittan, Essays, Moral, Political and Economic (Edinburgh University Press, 1998).
- Samuel Brittan, Against The Flow (Grove Atlantic Ltd., 2005).
