= Alexander Gray (poet) =

Scottish civil servant, economist, academic, translator, writer and poet

Sir Alexander Gray (6 January 1882 – 17 February 1968) was a Scottish civil servant, economist, academic, translator, writer and poet.

== Life and work ==
He was born at 1 Marshall Street in Lochee near Dundee the son of John Young Gray, an art teacher at the High School of Dundee, and his wife, Mary Young.

Gray spent his childhood in Dundee, and was educated at the High School of Dundee, going on to study mathematics and economics at the University of Edinburgh, graduating MA in 1902. This was followed by periods of study at Göttingen University and at the Sorbonne in Paris. During the First World War he worked in the civil service, employing his linguistic skills to produce anti-German propaganda.

In 1921 he was appointed professor of Political Economy at Aberdeen University, and whilst there he published one of his most important economic works, The Development of Economic Doctrine, in 1931. In 1934 he took up the equivalent post at Edinburgh University's School of Economics, which he held until his retirement in 1956. During the Second World War he returned to work for the civil service, returning to his professorship at Edinburgh after the war. In 1948 he published a study of the life and doctrines of Adam Smith.

He was elected a Fellow of the Royal Society of Edinburgh in 1942. His proposers were Edmund Taylor Whittaker, Sir Ernest Wedderburn, James Pickering Kendall, and James Ritchie. He served as the Society's Vice-President 1948 to 1951.

In addition to his economic writings, Gray was an active composer and translator of poetry. His work consisted of original poems written in English, and translations of the folk and ballad poetry of Germany and Denmark into Scots. Some of his work featured in Northern Numbers, a periodical founded and edited by Hugh MacDiarmid. Of his English poems, Scotland is internationally renowned, the third stanza being frequently quoted. This quote features on the Canongate Wall at the new Scottish Parliament building:

This is my country,
The land that begat me.
These windy spaces
Are surely my own.
And those who toil here
In the sweat of their faces
Are flesh of my flesh,
And bone of my bone.

His translations into Scots constitute the greater part of his work, and is the main basis for his reputation. His translations include a collection of ballads, Arrows, from German, and Historical Ballads of Denmark and Four and Forty from Danish. He translated many German poets, including von Kotzebue, Müller, Uhland, Herder but, above all, Heine.

Gray was awarded a CBE in 1939, followed by a knighthood in 1947.

He died in Edinburgh on 17 February 1968.

== Family ==
In 1909 he married Alice Gunn.

== Bibliography ==
- Adam Smith (1948)
- The Socialist Tradition: Moses to Lenin (1946)
- Any man's life: A book of poems (1924)
- Arrows. A book of German ballads and folksongs attempted in Scots. (1932)
- The Development of Economic Doctrine: An Introductory Survey (1st ed.). 1931 – via Internet Archive. Second edition, 1980
- Economics : yesterday and to-morrow. (1949)
- Family endowment: a critical analysis. (1927)
- Four-and-forty. A selection of Danish ballads presented in Scots (1954)
- Gossip: A new book of poems (1928)
- Historical ballads of Denmark (1958)
- New Leviathan: some illustrations of current German political theories. (1915)
- Poems. (1925)
- Robert Burns, man and poet. Address to the Scottish Arts Club ... 1944. (1944)
- Scottish staple at Veere. (1909)
- Sir Halewyn. Examples in European balladry and folk song. (1949)
- Some aspects of national health insurance. (1923)
- Songs and ballads, chiefly from Heine. (1920)
- Songs from Heine (Schumann's "Dichterliebe") (1928)
- Timorous civility a Scots miscellany
- True pastime: some observations on the German attitude towards war. (1915)
- Upright sheaf: Germany's intentions after the war. (1915)

== See also ==
- Golden Treasury of Scottish Poetry
- Scottish literature
