= Financial accelerator =

The financial accelerator in macroeconomics is the process by which adverse shocks to the economy may be amplified by worsening financial market conditions. More broadly, adverse conditions in the real economy and in financial markets propagate the financial and macroeconomic downturn.

== Financial accelerator mechanism ==
The link between the real economy and financial markets stems from firms’ need for external finance to engage in physical investment opportunities. Firms’ ability to borrow depends essentially on the market value of their net worth. The reason for this is asymmetric information between lenders and borrowers. Lenders are likely to have little information about the reliability of any given borrower. As such, they usually require borrowers to set forth their ability to repay, often in the form of collateralized assets. It follows that a fall in asset prices deteriorates the balance sheets of the firms and their net worth. The resulting deterioration of their ability to borrow has a negative impact on their investment. Decreased economic activity further cuts the asset prices down, which leads to a feedback cycle of falling asset prices, deteriorating balance sheets, tightening financing conditions and declining economic activity. This vicious cycle is called a financial accelerator. It is a financial feedback loop or a loan/credit cycle, which, starting from a small change in financial markets, is, in principle, able to produce a large change in economic conditions.

== History of acceleration in macroeconomics ==
The financial accelerator framework has been widely used in many studies during the 1980s and 1990s, especially by Bernanke, Gertler and Gilchrist, but the term “financial accelerator” has been introduced to the macroeconomics literature in their 1996 paper. The motivation of this paper was the longstanding puzzle that large fluctuations in aggregate economic activity sometimes seem to arise from seemingly small shocks, which rationalizes the existence of an accelerator mechanism. They argue that financial accelerator results from changes in credit market conditions, which affect the intrinsic costs of borrowing and lending associated with asymmetric information.

The principle of acceleration, namely the idea that small changes in demand can produce large changes in output, is an older phenomenon which has been used since the early 1900s. Although Aftalion's 1913 paper seems to be the first appearance of the acceleration principle, the essence of the accelerator framework could be found in a few other studies previously.

As a well-known example of the traditional view of acceleration, Samuelson (1939) argues that an increase in demand, for instance in government spending, leads to an increase in national income, which in turn drives consumption and investment, accelerating the economic activity. As a result, national income further increases, multiplying the initial effect of the stimulus through generating a virtuous cycle this time.

The roots of the modern view of acceleration go back to Fisher (1933). In his seminal work on debt and deflation, which tries to explain the underpinnings of the Great Depression, he studies a mechanism of a downward spiral in the economy induced by over-indebtedness and reinforced by a cycle of debt liquidation, assets and goods’ price deflation, net worth deterioration and economic contraction. His theory was disregarded in favor of Keynesian economics at that time.

Recently, with the rising view that financial market conditions are of high importance in driving the business cycles, the financial accelerator framework has revived again linking credit market imperfections to recessions as a source of a propagation mechanism. Many economists believe today that the financial accelerator framework describes well many of the financial-macroeconomic linkages underpinning the dynamics of The Great Depression and the subprime mortgage crisis.

== A simple theoretical framework ==
There are various ways of rationalizing a financial accelerator theoretically. One way is focusing on principal–agent problems in credit markets, as adopted by the influential works of Bernanke, Gertler and Gilchrist (1996), or Kiyotaki and Moore (1997).

The principal-agent view of credit markets refers to the costs (agency costs) associated with borrowing and lending due to imperfect and asymmetric information between lenders (principals) and borrowers (agents). Principals cannot access the information on investment opportunities (project returns), characteristics (creditworthiness) or actions (risk taking behavior) of the agents costlessly. These agency costs characterize three conditions that give rise to a financial accelerator:

1. External finance (debt) is more costly than internal finance (equity) unless it is fully collateralized, by which agency costs disappear as a result of guaranteed full repayment.
2. The premium on external finance increases with the amount of finance required but given a fixed amount of finance required, premium inversely varies with the borrower's net worth, which signals ability to repay.
3. A fall in borrower's net worth reduces the base for internal finance and raises the need for external finance at the same time raising the cost of it.

Thus, to the extent that net worth is affected by a negative (positive) shock, the effect of the initial shock is amplified due to decreased (increased) investment and production activities as a result of the credit crunch (boom).

The following model simply illustrates the ideas above:

Consider a firm, which possesses liquid assets such as cash holdings (C) and illiquid but collateralizable assets such as land (A). In order to produce output (Y) the firm uses inputs (X), but suppose that the firm needs to borrow (B) in order to finance input costs. Suppose for simplicity that the interest rate is zero. Suppose also that A can be sold with a price of P per unit after the production, and the price of X is normalized to 1. Thus, the amount of X that can be purchased is equal to the cash holdings plus the borrowing

$$X = C + B$$

Suppose now that it is costly for the lender to seize firm's output Y in case of default; however, ownership of the land A can be transferred to the lender if borrower defaults. Thus, land can serve as collateral. In this case, funds available to firm will be limited by the collateral value of the illiquid asset A, which is given by

$$B \leq P A$$

This borrowing constraint induces a feasibility constraint for the purchase of X

$$X \leq C + P A$$

Thus, spending on the input is limited by the net worth of the firm. If firm's net worth is less than the desired amount of X, the borrowing constraint will bind and firm's input will be limited, which also limits its output.

As can be seen from the feasibility constraint, borrower's net worth can be shrunk by a decline in the initial cash holdings C or asset prices P. Thus, an adverse shock to a firm's net worth (say an initial decline in the asset prices) deteriorates its balance sheet through limiting its borrowing and triggers a series of falling asset prices, falling net worth, deteriorating balance sheets, falling borrowing (thus investment) and falling output. Decreased economic activity feeds back to a fall in asset demand and asset prices further, causing a vicious cycle.

== Welfare losses and government intervention : an example from the subprime mortgage crisis ==
We have been experiencing the welfare consequences of the subprime mortgage crisis, in which relatively small losses on subprime assets have triggered large reductions in wealth, employment and output. As stated by Krishnamurthy (2010), the direct losses due to household default on subprime mortgages are estimated to be at most $500 bn, but the effects of the subprime shock have been far reaching. In order to prevent such huge welfare losses, governments may intervene in the financial markets and implement policies to mitigate the effects of the initial financial shock. For the credit market view of the financial accelerator, one policy implementation is to break the link between borrower's net worth and its ability to borrow as shown in the figure above.

There are various ways of breaking the mechanism of a financial accelerator. One way is to reverse the decline in the asset prices. When asset prices fall below a certain level, government can purchase assets at those prices, pulling up the demand for them and raising their prices back. The Federal Reserve was purchasing mortgage-backed securities in 2008 and 2009 with unusually low market prices. The supported asset prices pulls the net worth of the borrowers up, loosening the borrowing limits and stimulating investment.

== Financial accelerator in open economies ==
The financial accelerator also exists in emerging market crises in the sense that adverse shocks to a small open economy may be amplified by worsening international financial market conditions. Now the link between the real economy and the international financial markets stems from the need for international borrowing; firms’ borrowing to engage in profitable investment and production opportunities, households’ borrowing to smooth consumption when faced with income volatility or even governments’ borrowing from international funds.

Agents in an emerging economy often need external finance but informational frictions or limited commitment can limit their access to international capital markets. The information about the ability and willingness of a borrower to repay its debt is imperfectly observable so that the ability to borrow is often limited. The amount and terms of international borrowing depend on many conditions such as the credit history or default risk, output volatility or country risk, net worth or the value of collateralizable assets and the amount of outstanding liabilities.

An initial shock to productivity, world interest rate or country risk premium may lead to a “sudden stop” of capital inflows which blocks economic activity, accelerating the initial downturn. Or the familiar story of “debt-deflation” amplifies the adverse effects of an asset price shock when agents are highly indebted and the market value of their collateralizable assets deflates dramatically.

== See also ==
- Accelerator effect
