= School of Economics, University of Edinburgh =

Scottish school of economics

Coordinates: 55.943°N 3.186°W

The School of Economics is a department within the College of Arts, Humanities and Social Sciences at the University of Edinburgh in Scotland.

The university's first lessons in economics were delivered by Dugald Stewart in 1800, while William Ballantyne Hodgson was appointed as the first actual economics professor in 1871. The subject's development progressed slowly until the subject became a major, then department and finally a separate school.

Having initially been titled the Department of Economics under the auspices of the University of Edinburgh's Faculty of Social Sciences, the school was moved to a department of the University of Edinburgh Business School, then known as the University of Edinburgh Management School, in 2002. In 2009, the school was renamed as the School of Economics, operating independently under the College of Humanities and Social Science's umbrella.

== Faculty ==
- Alexander Gray, chair, 1935-1956.
- John Hardman Moore, 2001–present.
- Frederick Ogilvie, chair, 1926-1935.
- Alan T. Peacock, chair, 1956-1962.
- Yongcheol Shin, lecturer, 1998-2000.
