= Alan T. Peacock =

English economist

Sir Alan Turner Peacock DSC, FBA, FRSE (26 June 1922 – 2 August 2014) was a British economist.

== Early life ==
Alan Turner Peacock was born in Ryton-on-Tyne (then part of County Durham) in 1922. He was the son of the scientist Alexander David Peacock, who in 1926 became Professor of Natural History at University College, Dundee (then part of the University of St Andrews). On his father's appointment, the family moved to Broughty Ferry. He was educated at Grove Academy, the High School of Dundee and the University of St Andrews, where he completed a war-shortened degree in economics and history.

== Career ==
Having completed correspondence courses in economics while serving with the Royal Navy during the Second World War, upon being demobilised, Peacock resumed his studies at St Andrews, graduating with another degree in economics and political science in 1947. He then taught at St Andrews, the London School of Economics (where he also conducted the LSE Orchestra), the University of Edinburgh's School of Economics, the University of York (where he founded the Department of Economics), the University of Buckingham of which he was the Vice-Chancellor from 1980 to 1984, and finally at Heriot-Watt University where he was honorary professor of public finance at the Edinburgh Business School until his death.

From 1973 to 1976, Peacock was the Chief Economic Adviser to the Department of Trade and Industry of the United Kingdom. He was also a co-founder and the first Executive Director of the David Hume Institute. During the 1970s and 1980s, he played a leading role in the field of cultural economics.

From 1984 to 1986, Peacock served as Chairman of the Committee on the Financing of the BBC (Peacock Committee), the tenth major British inquiry into broadcasting. The Committee rejected Margaret Thatcher's wish to fund the BBC by advertising and proposed a sophisticated long-term strategy in which given a full broadcasting market with unlimited channels and freedom of entry, subscription would replace the licence fee. The model developed by Peacock later on served as a blueprint for Ofcom's Public Service Publisher.

== Awards and fellowships ==
He was a Fellow of the British Academy, the Accademia dei Lincei, and the Royal Society of Edinburgh, and was in addition an Honorary Fellow of the Institute of Economic Affairs. He was a recipient of the Distinguished Service Cross for his intelligence work in the Arctic Ocean during World War II and was knighted in 1987.

== Books ==
His many academic books include The Economics of National Insurance (1952), The Economic Theory of Fiscal Policy (1971, co-author G. K. Shaw), Public Choice Analysis in Historical Perspective (1992), and The Political Economy of Economic Freedom (1997). He also authored four autobiographical volumes. In "The Enigmatic Sailor" (2003). Peacock treats his experiences and achievements as a sailor in naval intelligence during World War II, for which he was awarded the DSC. Paying the Piper (1993) lays out his application of economics to understand the arts. In Anxious to do Good (2010), Peacock gives an account of his involvement in public policy, including the financing of the BBC. Defying Decrepitude (2013), a light-hearted account of the costs and benefits of retirement, was his last book.

== Other interests ==
He was also a composer of music, and studied composition with the Austrian composer Hans Gál.

== See also ==
- Peacock Committee
- Royal Commission on the Constitution
- 1987 Birthday Honours
- German Wikipedia entry
- "Professor Sir Alan Turner Peacock DSC, FBA, FRSE", FamilySearch
