= Gerardo Ceballos =

Mexican zoologist (born 1958)

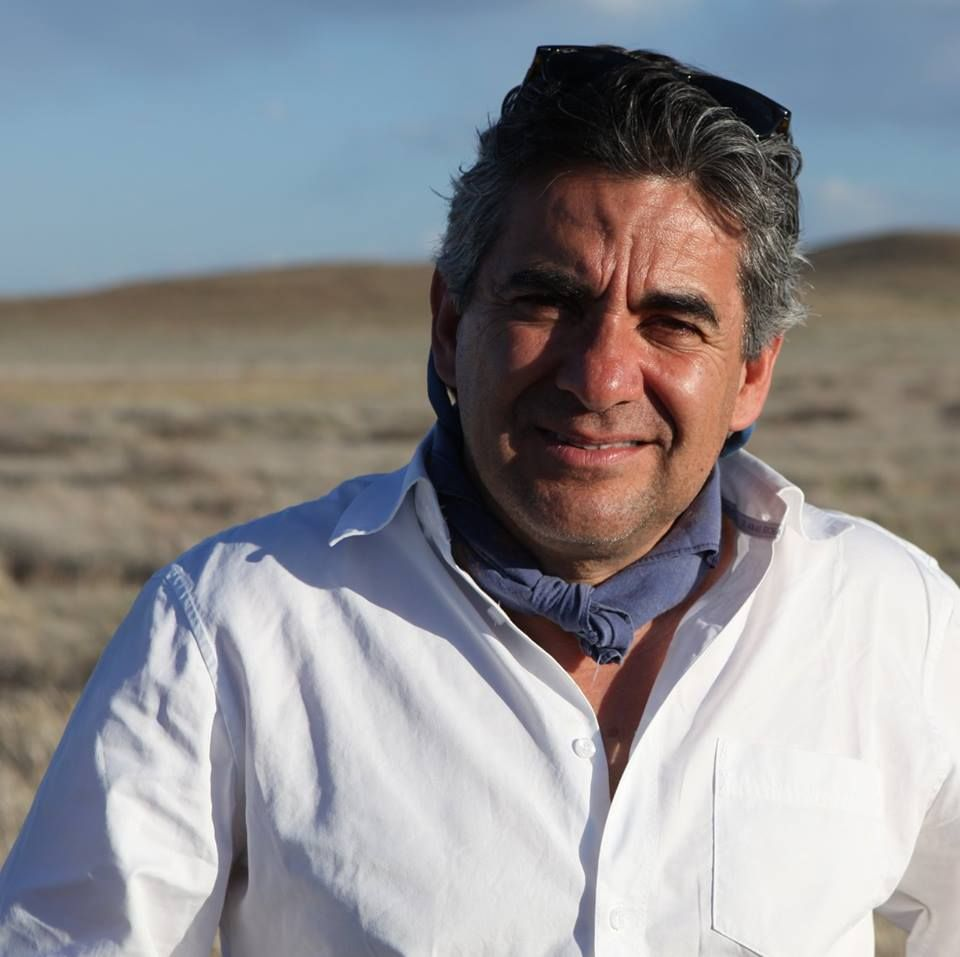
- Gerardo Ceballos, 2013
- Born: October 3, 1958 (age 67); Toluca, Mexico
- Education: Universidad Autónoma Metropolitana; Bangor University; University of Arizona
- Known for: Ecology of endangered species, conservation biology, macroecology
- Scientific career
- Fields: Biology, Ecology, Conservation biology
- Workplaces: National Autonomous University of Mexico

Gerardo Jorge Ceballos González (born 3 October 1958) is a Mexican biologist, ecologist, and conservationist.

== Biography ==
Ceballos was born in Toluca in 1958, the son of Oscar Ceballos and Leonor González. From 1975 to 1979 he studied at the Universidad Autónoma Metropolitana in Iztapalapa, where he received a bachelor's degree in biology and ecology. From 1979 to 1980 he was a lecturer at the Institute of Ecology in Mexico City. In 1980 he obtained a Master of Science degree at Bangor University in Wales with the thesis Experimental studies of grazing and its role in the balance of plant species. From 1984 to 1987 he taught at the Institute of Ecology at the University of Arizona in Tucson. In 1988 he was a visiting lecturer at the National Autonomous University of Mexico (UNAM). In 1989 he earned his Ph.D. at the University of Arizona with the dissertation Population and community ecology of small mammals from tropical deciduous and arroyo forests in western Mexico. In the same year he was a visiting lecturer at the University of New Mexico in Albuquerque. Since 1990 he has been a professor of biology at UNAM.

Ceballos's research areas include population and community ecology, macroecology and biogeography, the ecology and conservation of endangered species, the design and preservation of nature reserves, and environmental impact assessment and ecological planning.

In 1993 Ceballos was among the co-founders of the Chamela-Cuixmala Biosphere Reserve, a 131.42 km^{2} biosphere reserve in Jalisco, which received the status of a Ramsar site in 2004.

Ceballos has been married since 1983 and has one son.

== Memberships and honors ==
In 1988 Ceballos was among the co-founders of the Asociación Mexicana de Mastozoología (Mexican Mammalogy Society), served as its president from 1988 to 1989, and was editor-in-chief from 1990 to 1993. Since 2014 he has been a member of the American Academy of Arts and Sciences, and since 2018 of the National Academy of Sciences.

He has received several awards. In 1990 he received an honorable mention in the Rolex Awards for Enterprise in Switzerland. In 2004 he received the Distinguished Service Award from the Society for Conservation Biology. In 2005 he was awarded a Guggenheim Fellowship. In 2010 he was one of six finalists for the Indianapolis Prize, a prestigious conservation award established in 2005 by the Indianapolis Zoological Society. In 2023 he was awarded the BBVA Foundation Frontiers of Knowledge Award.

== Selected works ==
- Mamíferos silvestres de la cuenca de México, 1984 (with Carlos Galindo Leal)
- Mexican Diversity of Fauna, 1993 (with Fulvio Eccardi and Patricio Robles Gil)
- Las aves de México en peligro de extinción, 2000 (with Laura Márquez Valdelamar)
- Diversidad y conservación de los mamíferos neotropicales, 2002 (with Javier Simonetti)
- The mammals of Mexico: composition, distribution, and conservation status, 2002 (with Joaquín Arroyo-Cabrales and Rodrigo A. Medellín)
- Animales de México en peligro de extinción, 2003 (with Fulvio Eccardi)
- Los mamíferos silvestres de México, 2005 (with Gisselle Oliva)
- Naturaleza mexicana: legado de conservación, 2008 (with Rurik List, Rodrigo A. Medellín, Ximena de la Macorra, Antonio Vizcaíno, Jorge Alberto Sandoval, Teléfonos de México and Grupo Carso)
- Mammals of Mexico, 2014
- The annihilation of nature: human extinction of birds and mammals, 2015 (with Anne H. Ehrlich and Paul R. Ehrlich)
- Before They Vanish: Saving Nature’s Populations – and Ourselves, 2024 (with Paul R. Ehrlich and Rodolfo Dirzo)
