= Peacock Committee =

The Peacock Committee was a review into financing of the BBC. It was initiated by the Conservative government of Margaret Thatcher on 27 March 1985 and reporting on 29 May 1986. The committee was led by Professor Alan Peacock. The other six members were Samuel Brittan, Judith Chalmers, Jeremy Hardie, Professor Alastair Hetherington, Lord Quinton, and Sir Peter Reynolds.

The government had expected the committee to report that the television licence fee used to fund the BBC should be scrapped. However, the Peacock Committee favoured retaining the licence fee as they believed it was the 'least worst' option.

The immediate recommendations of the report were:

- BBC Radio 1 and BBC Radio 2 should be privatised.
- All television receivers should be built fitted with encryption decoders.
- The television licence fee should be indexed to inflation and the BBC should become responsible for the collection of the licence fee.
- The licence fee should be extended to car radios.
- Pensioners dependent on benefits should be exempt from the licence fee.
- Not less than 40% of the BBC's and ITV’s output should be sourced from independent producers.
- The transmission space used by the BBC and ITV overnight should be sold.
- ITV franchises should be put out to competitive tender
- Channel 4 should be able to sell its own advertising.
- Censorship should be phased out.
