= Pedro L. Alonso =

Spanish physician, epidemiologist, and researcher

Pedro L. Alonso (born March 18, 1959, in Madrid, Spain), is a physician, epidemiologist, and researcher in diseases that affect vulnerable populations. Based on a multidisciplinary approach, his work focuses mainly on malaria, although he has also studied other infectious diseases. He served as the Director of the Global Malaria Programme at the World Health Organization between 2014 and 2022, and is currently Professor of Global Health at the Faculty of Medicine and Health Science-Hospital Clinic, at the University of Barcelona.

== Education and professional career ==
Pedro Alonso completed his high school education at the United World College of the Atlantic. After obtaining his medical degree at the Autonomous University of Madrid in 1984, Pedro L. Alonso earned a Masters in Epidemiology and Control of Communicable Diseases at the London School of Hygiene and Tropical Medicine. He then obtained a PhD in medicine in the University of Barcelona. He is also a specialist in Community Medicine and Public Health by the Spanish Ministry of Health.

His professional career began in The Gambia in the 1980s. A study on the validation of verbal autopsies was followed by the scientific assessment of the efficacy of Insecticide Treated Nets (ITNs) as a preventive tool against malaria. The utility of such nets was, at the time, controversial, and the publication of new results in The Lancet was critical for the launching of subsequent studies confirming first evaluations. Based on this evidence, WHO recommended the universal use of ITNs as a vector control tool, since a pillar in the fight against malaria. It is estimated that extensive distribution programs of ITNs can claim responsibility for 69% of the 663 million of averted malaria cases in Subsaharan Africa between 2001 and 2015.

After a short stay at the Instituto de Parasitología "López Neyra", Consejo Superior de Investigaciones Científicas, in Granada, Spain, Pedro L. Alonso settled in Barcelona in 1991 to head the Epidemiology & Biostatistics Unit at the Hospital Clinic, an institution to which he would remain linked for more than 20 years and where he created and directed the Center for International Health –the first of its kind in a Spanish university hospital.

While in Barcelona, he promoted his first international collaborations, most notably with the Ifakara Health Institute (Tanzania), where along with Dr. Marcel Tanner, he worked in the evaluation of the malaria vaccine SPf66. In collaboration with Dr. Clara Menéndez, Pedro L. Alonso broadened his research field to include malaria prophylaxis in children under 1 year old, evaluation of new malaria control strategies such as intermittent treatment for children and pregnant women, etiology of anemia, and the study of further causes of death and disease in African children including acute respiratory diseases and diarrheas.

With the support of the Hospital Clínic and the University of Barcelona, he founded in 2006 the Barcelona Centre for International Health Research (CRESIB). In this institution he accomplished one of his most renowned works, the contribution to the clinical development and impact assessment of a new malaria vaccine: RTS,S. In collaboration with the Manhiça Health Research Centre in Mozambique, he implemented two proofs of concept that established for the first time the efficacy of the vaccine in infants and children aged 1–4 years. These results opened the door to subsequent assessments and to a Phase 3 clinical trial performed in 11 African research centres. Ultimately, this vaccine received a positive assessment by the European Drugs Agency, in 2015, while the highest expert committees at WHO have recommended that it starts to be utilized, as of 2018, in pilot programs in three African countries.

Apart from his own activities as scientific researcher, Pedro L. Alonso has devoted considerable efforts to facilitate the development of research capacities in Africa, as well as to training new generations of scientists both in Spain and in developing countries. He has directed 24 doctoral dissertations in a variety of fields ranging from basic biology, epidemiology, evaluation of new interventions or clinical development of drugs and vaccines for respiratory and diarrheal diseases, HIV, tuberculosis and malaria.

In regard to the creation of institutions, the foundation of the Manhiça Health Research Centre (CISM) in Mozambique is of particular importance. Launched in 1996 in the context of cooperation agreements between Mozambique and Spain, CISM receives funds from the Spanish Agency for International Cooperation. Pedro L. Alonso was CISM scientific director from 1996 to 2008, year in which the ownership of the centre was trespassed to a fully Mozambican institution: Fundaçao Manhiça. For several years, CISM stood as the only African centre with a demographic surveillance system and pioneered broad clinical studies in Africa. CISM was distinguished in 2008 with the Príncipe de Asturias Award for International Cooperation, with three other African institutions.

This same line of work prompted the foundation of the Barcelona Institute for Global Health (ISGlobal), for which he also served as the first general director. ISGlobal aims to break the vicious circle of poverty and disease with an integrated approach that extracts and implements knowledge through its areas of Training, Policy, and Global Development. At an international level, Pedro L. Alonso participated, together with Dr. Fred Binka, in the creation of the European and Developing Countries Clinical Trial Partnership, a joint endeavor by European and African countries with the objective of promoting and funding the development of new tools against malaria, tuberculosis and HIV.

As a result of a paradigm shift that makes of malaria eradication a shared objective by the international community, Pedro L. Alonso led, jointly with Dr. Marcel Tanner, the Malaria Eradication Research Agenda (malERA) initiative that defined research and future development needs for malaria eradication. Results of malERA were published in 2011 in PLoS Medicine and led to the creation of the Malaria Eradication Scientific Alliance (MESA).

Between October 2014 and March 2022, Pedro L. Alonso was the Director of the Global Malaria Programme at the WHO, and was responsible for coordinating efforts to control and eliminate malaria and establish norms, technical guidelines and policies to support countries affected by this disease.

Beyond the malaria field, Pedro L. Alonso, Ciro de Quadros, and Christopher Elias led the Committee that developed the Global Vaccine Action Plan, approved by the World Health Assembly in 2012. Dr. Alonso has been a member of numerous expert committees at WHO, the European Union, Medicines for Malaria Venture, TDR or the Spanish Ministry of Health, among others.

== Current position ==
Pedro L. Alonso is currently Professor of Global Health at the Faculty of Medicine and Health Science-Hospital Clinic, at the University of Barcelona.

== Publications and awards ==
Pedro L. Alonso is included in the "top 20" list of most cited authors in the malaria field and also is on list of the 50 most influential people in the vaccines field.

Throughout his career, he has published more than 350 articles and has received, among other awards, the Grand Cross of the Civil Order of Health (Ministry of Health, Spain), the Red Cross and Red Crescent Golden Medal (Barcelona, Spain), the Josep Trueta medal (Generalitat of Catalonia, Spain), the Balmis award (Ministry of Defense, Spain), the Ronald Ross Medal (London School of Hygiene and Tropical Medicine, UK), the BBVA Foundation Frontiers of Knowledge Award (Spain), and the Carlos IV award (Royal National Academy of Medicine, Spain). He is an International Honorary Fellow of the American Society of Tropical Medicine and Hygiene.

Since 2008, Pedro L. Alonso is Professor of Global Health at the University of Barcelona and has been awarded Doctor Honoris Causa by the Universidad Europea de Madrid and the Universidad Rey Juan Carlos

== Personal life ==
Pedro L. Alonso is married to Clara Menéndez, a researcher expert in malaria in pregnancy. They have three children, Yara, Miguel and Sofía.
