= Robert Östling =

Swedish economist

Robert Östling (born 12 September 1977) is a professor of economics at the Stockholm School of Economics (SSE).

Östling obtained his PhD from SSE in 2008 with the dissertation Bounded Rationality and Endogenous Preferences. After that he obtained a position at the Institute for International Economics Studies at Stockholm University, where he worked until 2018 when he returned to SSE.

In 2009, Östling received the award Arnbergska priset by the Royal Swedish Academy of Sciences.

Östling has published in top economics journals such as The Review of Economic Studies, American Economic Review, and the Quarterly Journal of Economics.
