= Kiyotaki–Moore model =

The Kiyotaki–Moore model of credit cycles is an economic model developed by Nobuhiro Kiyotaki and John H. Moore that shows how small shocks to the economy might be amplified by credit restrictions, giving rise to large output fluctuations. The model assumes that borrowers cannot be forced to repay their debts. Therefore, in equilibrium, lending occurs only if it is collateralized. That is, borrowers must own a sufficient quantity of capital that can be confiscated in case they fail to repay. This collateral requirement amplifies business cycle fluctuations because in a recession, the income from capital falls, causing the price of capital to fall, which makes capital less valuable as collateral, which limits firms' investment by forcing them to reduce their borrowing, and thereby worsens the recession.

Kiyotaki (a macroeconomist) and Moore (a contract theorist) originally described their model in a 1997 paper in the Journal of Political Economy. Their model has become influential because earlier real business cycle models typically relied on large exogenous shocks to account for fluctuations in aggregate output. The Kiyotaki–Moore model shows instead how relatively small shocks might suffice to explain business cycle fluctuations, if credit markets are imperfect.

== Structure of the model ==
In their model economy, Kiyotaki and Moore assume two types of decision makers, with different time preference rates: "patient" and "impatient." The "patient" agents are called "gatherers" in the original paper, but should be interpreted as households that wish to save. The "impatient" agents are called "farmers" in the original paper, but should be interpreted as entrepreneurs or firms that wish to borrow in order to finance their investment projects.

Two key assumptions limit the effectiveness of the credit market in the model. First, the knowledge of the "farmers" is an essential input to their own investment projects—that is, a project becomes worthless if the farmer who made the investment chooses to abandon it. Second, farmers cannot be forced to work, and therefore they cannot sell off their future labor to guarantee their debts. Together, these assumptions imply that even though farmers' investment projects are potentially very valuable, lenders have no way to confiscate this value if farmers choose not to pay back their debts.

Therefore, loans will only be made if they are backed by some other form of capital which can be confiscated in case of default. In other words, loans must be backed by collateral. Kiyotaki and Moore's paper considers land as an example of a collateralizable asset. Thus land plays two distinct roles in the model: (i) it is a productive input, and (ii) it also serves as collateral for debt.

Hence, impatient agents must provide real estate as collateral if they wish to borrow. If for any reason the value of real estate declines, so does the amount of debt they can acquire. This feeds back into the real estate market, driving the price of land down further (thus, the borrowing decisions of the impatient agents are strategic complements). This positive feedback is what amplifies economic fluctuations in the model.

The paper also analyzes cases where debt contracts are set only in nominal terms or where contracts can be set in real terms, and considers the differences between the cases.

== Extensions ==
The original paper of Kiyotaki and Moore was theoretical in nature, and made little attempt to evaluate the quantitative relevance of their mechanism for actual economies. In 2005, Kiyotaki's student Matteo Iacoviello embedded the Kiyotaki-Moore mechanism inside a standard New Keynesian general equilibrium macroeconomic model. For realism, Iacoviello assumed that the collateralizable form of capital corresponds to real estate, and compared the predictions of his model with observed fluctuations of real housing prices in the United States.
