= John Moore (economist) =

British economist

John H. Moore
- Born: 7 May 1954 (age 72)

Academic background
- Education: Fitzwilliam College, Cambridge; London School of Economics

Academic work
- Discipline: Economics
- Institutions: University of Edinburgh School of Economics; London School of Economics
- Doctoral students: Tore Ellingsen
- Awards: Yrjö Jahnsson Award (1999); Stephen A. Ross Prize (2010); BBVA Foundation Frontiers of Knowledge Awards (2020)
- Website: Information at IDEAS / RePEc

John Halstead Hardman Moore CBE FBA FRSE (born 7 May 1954) is an economic theorist. He was appointed George Watson's and Daniel Stewart's Chair of Political Economy at the University of Edinburgh School of Economics in 2000. In 2018 he was appointed the David Hume University Professor at the University of Edinburgh. Previously, in 1983, he was appointed to the London School of Economics, where in 1990 he became Professor of Economic Theory, a position he still holds.

== Education and career ==
Moore obtained a B.A. in Mathematics at Fitzwilliam College, Cambridge in 1976, an M.Sc. in Econometrics and Mathematical Economics at the London School of Economics (LSE) in 1980, and a Ph.D. in Economics at the LSE in 1984. At the LSE he was appointed Lecturer in Economics in 1983, Reader in Economics in 1987, and Professor of Economic Theory in 1990. In 2000 he was appointed to the George Watson's and Daniel Stewart's Chair of Political Economy at the University of Edinburgh.

Moore has held visiting positions at the Massachusetts Institute of Technology and Princeton University. Between 1997 and 2000, he was a professor of economics at the University of St Andrews. He was a managing editor of the Review of Economic Studies, 1987–91. He was the first director of the Scottish Institute for Research in Economics from 2006 to 2009. In 2018, he was appointed David Hume University Chair of Economics at the University of Edinburgh and School Professor of Economics and Political Science at the London School of Economics.

== Research contribution ==
He is known for his contribution to the Grossman–Hart–Moore theory of property rights and the Kiyotaki–Moore model of credit cycles.

== Honours and awards ==
Moore was elected a fellow of the Econometric Society in 1989, of the British Academy in 1999, of the Royal Society of Edinburgh in 2003, and of the European Economic Association in 2004. He is a Foreign Honorary Member of the American Academy of Arts and Sciences and the American Economic Association. Moore was the 2010 president of the Econometric Society. Moore is the president of the Royal Economic Society now (2015–2017).

Moore was the recipient of the 1999 Yrjö Jahnsson Award of the European Economic Association. He shared the prize with Nobuhiro Kiyotaki. In 2010, Kiyotaki and Moore won the Stephen A. Ross Prize in Financial Economics for their 1997 paper "Credit Cycles" in the Journal of Political Economy. In 2020 he was awarded the BBVA Foundation Frontiers of Knowledge Award in the category "Economics, Finance and Management".

He was appointed Commander of the Order of the British Empire (CBE) in the 2017 Birthday Honours for services to economics.
