= Nobuhiro Kiyotaki =

Japanese economist (born 1955)

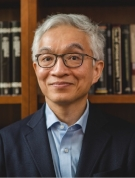
- Born: June 24, 1955 (age 71)

Academic background
- Education: University of Tokyo (BA); Harvard University (PhD)
- Doctoral advisor: Olivier Blanchard

Academic work
- Discipline: Macroeconomics
- School or tradition: New Keynesian economics
- Institutions: Princeton University
- Doctoral students: Luis Carranza; Chen Nan-kuang
- Notable ideas: Kiyotaki–Wright model Kiyotaki–Moore model
- Awards: Nakahara Prize (1997); Yrjö Jahnsson Award (1999); Fellow of the British Academy (2003); Stephen A. Ross Prize (2010); BBVA Foundation Frontiers of Knowledge Award (2020)

Nobuhiro Kiyotaki FBA (清滝 信宏, Kiyotaki Nobuhiro) (born June 24, 1955) is a Japanese economist and the Harold H. Helms '20 Professor of Economics and Banking at Princeton University. He is especially known for proposing several models that provide deeper microeconomic foundations for macroeconomics, some of which play a prominent role in New Keynesian macroeconomics.

== Career ==
He received a B.A. from University of Tokyo in 1978. After receiving his doctorate in economics from Harvard University in 1985, Kiyotaki held faculty positions at the Univ. of Wisconsin–Madison, the Univ. of Minnesota, and the London School of Economics before moving to Princeton.

He is a fellow of the Econometric Society, was awarded the 1997 Nakahara Prize of the Japan Economics Association and the 1999 Yrjö Jahnsson Award of the European Economic Association, the latter together with John Moore. In 2003, Kiyotaki was elected a Fellow of the British Academy (FBA), the United Kingdom's national academy for the humanities and social sciences. He is also a fellow of the European Economic Association. Thomson Reuters lists Kiyotaki among the 'citation laureates' who are likely future winners of the Nobel Prize in Economics.

Kiyotaki also received the Stephen A. Ross Prize in Financial Economics together with John Moore. In 2020 he was awarded the BBVA Foundation Frontiers of Knowledge Award in the category "Economics, Finance and Management".

== Contributions ==
In 1987, together with Olivier Blanchard, Kiyotaki demonstrated the importance of monopolistic competition for the aggregate demand multiplier. Most New Keynesian macroeconomic models now assume monopolistic competition for the reasons outlined by Blanchard and Kiyotaki.

Later, Kiyotaki worked with Randall Wright to construct a model of the role of money, showing how money increased economic efficiency by permitting trade of many different types of goods which might not be traded under a system of barter. This model, which formalized William Stanley Jevons' insight about the double coincidence of wants as a barrier to economic activity under barter, has come to be known as the Kiyotaki–Wright model.

In 1997, with John Moore, Kiyotaki constructed a model to show how small shocks to the economy might be amplified into large output fluctuations through the interaction between real estate prices and restrictions on the availability of credit. This model of 'credit cycles' is now known as the Kiyotaki–Moore model.

== Recognition ==
- 1997 - Nakahara Prize
- 1999 - Yrjö Jahnsson Award
- 2010 - Stephen A. Ross Prize in Financial Economics
- 2010 - Clarivate Citation Laureates
- 2015 - 2014 Senior Prize of BDF-TSE in Monetary Economics and Finance
- 2020 - Person of Cultural Merit
- 2020 - BBVA Foundation Frontiers of Knowledge Award

== Learned societies membership ==
- Fellow of the British Academy
- Fellow of the Econometric Society
- Fellow of European Economic Association
- Fellow of Japanese Economic Association

== Selected publications ==
=== Journal articles ===
- Blanchard, Olivier Jean; Kiyotaki, Nobuhiro (1987). "Monopolistic Competition and the Effects of Aggregate Demand" (PDF). American Economic Review. 77 (4): 647–66. JSTOR 1814537. Archived from the original (PDF) on 2021-10-24.
- Kiyotaki, Nobuhiro; Wright, Randall (1989). "On Money as a Medium of Exchange". Journal of Political Economy. 97 (4): 927–54. doi:10.1086/261634. JSTOR 1832197. S2CID 154872512.
- Kiyotaki, Nobuhiro; Wright, Randall (1993). "A Search-Theoretic Approach to Monetary Economics" (PDF). American Economic Review. 83 (1): 63–77. JSTOR 2117496. Archived from the original (PDF) on 2015-09-23.
- Kiyotaki, Nobuhiro; Moore, John (1997). "Credit Cycles" (PDF). Journal of Political Economy. 105 (2): 211–248. doi:10.1086/262072. JSTOR 10.1086/262072. S2CID 222433833.
