= Guido Tabellini =

Italian economist (born 1956)

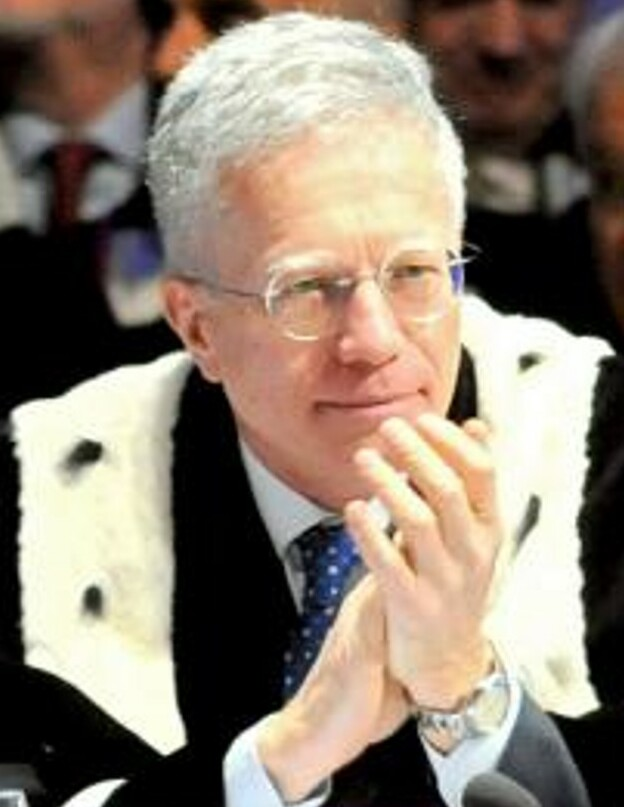
- Born: 26 January 1956 (age 70); Turin, Italy

Academic background
- Education: University of California, Los Angeles (UCLA) (Ph.D., 1984); University of Turin (Laurea, 1980)
- Doctoral advisor: David K. Levine

Academic work
- Discipline: Political economics
- School or tradition: Constitutional economics
- Institutions: Bocconi University
- Awards: Yrjö Jahnsson Award (2001); BBVA Foundation Frontiers of Knowledge Award (2022)
- Website: Information at IDEAS / RePEc

Guido Enrico Tabellini (born 26 January 1956) is an Italian economist. He was the rector of the Bocconi University from November 2008 until 2012.

Tabellini received his Laurea in 1980 from the University of Turin, and his Ph.D. in 1984 from the University of California, Los Angeles (UCLA). He first taught at Stanford University, then at UCLA, and later in Italy. He is past president of the European Economic Association. He was consultant to the World Bank and Italian government.

In 2003, Tabellini published The Economic Effects of Constitutions. Munich Lectures in Economics.

In May 2008, he was appointed as rector (president) of Bocconi University (Milan), in charge from 1 November 2008. He left this position in July 2012.

== Awards and honors ==
- 1987–1988 Political Economy Fellowship, Carnegie Mellon University
- 1987–1992 Faculty Research Fellow, NBER
- 1987–now Research Fellow, CEPR
- 1992–97, 2001–now Council of the European Economic Association
- 1999 Distinguished Fellow, CES, LMU Munich
- 2001 Yrjö Jahnsson Award, European Economic Association, Lausanne
- 2001 Fellow of the Econometric Society
- 2001 Research Associate, CEPS, Bruxelles
- 2001 International Research Fellow, Kiel Institute for World Economic Studies
- 2003 Research Fellow, Canadian Institute of Economic Research
- 2003 Foreign Honorary Member, American Academy of Arts and Sciences
- 2005 Vice-president, European Economic Association
- 2006 Council of Econometric Society
- 2007 President, European Economic Association
- 2008–2012 Rector, Bocconi University
- 2022 BBVA Foundation Frontiers of Knowledge Award
- 2024 John von Neumann Award, Rajk College for Advanced Studies, Budapest

== Works ==
- Political Economics – Explaining Economic Policy (with Torsten Persson), MIT Press, 2000.
- The Economic Effects of Constitutions (with Torsten Persson), MIT Press 2003.
