= Allotropes of carbon =

Materials made only out of carbon

Eight allotropes of carbon: (a) diamond, (b) graphite, (c) lonsdaleite, (d) C_{60} buckminsterfullerene, (e) C_{540} fullerene (f) C_{70} fullerene, (g) amorphous carbon, (h) armchair single-walled carbon nanotube. Missing: cyclocarbon, carbon nanobuds, schwarzites, glassy carbon, and linear acetylenic carbon (carbyne)

Carbon is capable of forming many allotropes (structurally different forms of the same element) due to its valency (tetravalent). Well-known forms of carbon include diamond and graphite. In recent decades, many more allotropes have been discovered and researched, including ball shapes such as buckminsterfullerene and sheets such as graphene. Larger-scale structures of carbon include nanotubes, nanobuds, carbon quantum dots and nanoribbons. Other unusual forms of carbon exist at very high temperatures or extreme pressures. Around 500 hypothetical 3‑periodic allotropes of carbon are known as of 2016, according to the Samara Carbon Allotrope Database (SACADA).

== Atomic and diatomic carbon ==
Under certain conditions, carbon can be found in its atomic form. It can be formed by vaporizing graphite, by passing large electric currents to form a carbon arc under very low pressure. It is extremely reactive, but it is an intermediate product used in the creation of carbenes.

Diatomic carbon can also be found under certain conditions. It is often detected via spectroscopy in extraterrestrial bodies, including comets and certain stars.

== Diamond ==
Diamond is a well-known allotrope of carbon. The hardness, extremely high refractive index, and high dispersion of light make diamond useful for industrial applications and for jewelry. Diamond is the hardest known natural mineral. This makes it an excellent abrasive and makes it hold polish and luster extremely well. No known naturally occurring substance can cut or scratch diamond, except another diamond. In diamond form, carbon is one of the costliest elements.

The crystal structure of diamond is a face-centered cubic lattice having eight atoms per unit cell to form a diamond cubic structure. Each carbon atom is covalently bonded to four other carbons in a tetrahedral geometry. These tetrahedrons together form a 3-dimensional network of six-membered carbon rings in the chair conformation, allowing for zero bond angle strain. The bonding occurs through sp^{3} hybridized orbitals to give a C-C bond length of 154 pm. This network of unstrained covalent bonds makes diamond extremely strong. Diamond is thermodynamically less stable than graphite at pressures below 1.7 GPa.

The dominant industrial use of diamond is cutting, drilling (drill bits), grinding (diamond edged cutters), and polishing. Most uses of diamonds in these technologies do not require large diamonds, and most diamonds that are not gem-quality can find an industrial use. Diamonds are embedded in drill tips and saw blades or ground into a powder for use in grinding and polishing applications (due to its extraordinary hardness). Specialized applications include use in laboratories as containment for high pressure experiments (see diamond anvil), high-performance bearings, and specialized windows of technical apparatuses.

The market for industrial-grade diamonds operates much differently from its gem-grade counterpart. Industrial diamonds are valued mostly for their hardness and heat conductivity, making many of the gemological characteristics of diamond, including clarity and color, mostly irrelevant. This helps explain why 80% of mined diamonds (equal to about 100 million carats or 20 tonnes annually) are unsuitable for use as gemstones and known as bort, destined for industrial use. In addition to mined diamonds, synthetic diamonds found industrial applications almost immediately after their invention in the 1950s; another 400 million carats (80 tonnes) of synthetic diamonds are produced annually for industrial use, which is nearly four times the mass of natural diamonds mined over the same period.

Continuing advances in the production of synthetic diamond have made future applications feasible, combined with increased quality and quantity of supply available from synthetic diamond manufacturers. Possible uses, covered by research efforts in Japan, Europe, and the United States, include diamond as a semiconductor suitable to build microchips from, or as a heat sink in electronics.

== Graphite ==
Graphite, named by Abraham Gottlob Werner in 1789, from the Greek γράφειν (graphein, "to draw/write", for its use in pencils) is one of the most common allotropes of carbon. Unlike diamond, graphite is an electrical conductor. Thus, it can be used in, for instance, electrical arc lamp electrodes. Likewise, under standard conditions, graphite is the most stable form of carbon. Therefore, it is used in thermochemistry as the standard state for defining the heat of formation of carbon compounds.

Graphite conducts electricity, due to delocalization of the pi bond electrons above and below the planes of the carbon atoms. These electrons are free to move, so are able to conduct electricity. However, the electricity is only conducted along the plane of the layers. In diamond, all four outer electrons of each carbon atom are 'localized' between the atoms in covalent bonding. The movement of electrons is restricted and diamond does not conduct an electric current. In graphite, each carbon atom uses only 3 of its 4 outer energy level electrons in covalently bonding to three other carbon atoms in a plane. Each carbon atom contributes one electron to a delocalized system of electrons that is also a part of the chemical bonding. The delocalized electrons are free to move throughout the plane. For this reason, graphite conducts electricity along the planes of carbon atoms, but does not conduct electricity in a direction at right angles to the plane.

Graphite powder is used as a dry lubricant. Although it might be thought that this industrially important property is due entirely to the loose interlamellar coupling between sheets in the structure, in fact in a vacuum environment (such as in technologies for use in space), graphite was found to be a very poor lubricant. This fact led to the discovery that graphite's lubricity is due to adsorbed air and water between the layers, unlike other layered dry lubricants such as molybdenum disulfide. Recent studies suggest that an effect called superlubricity can also account for this effect.

When a large number of crystallographic defects (physical) bind these planes together, graphite loses its lubrication properties and becomes pyrolytic carbon, a useful material in blood-contacting implants such as prosthetic heart valves.

Graphite is the most stable allotrope of carbon. Contrary to popular belief, high-purity graphite does not readily burn, even at elevated temperatures. For this reason, it is used in nuclear reactors and for high-temperature crucibles for melting metals. At very high temperatures and pressures (roughly 2000 °C and 5 GPa), it can be transformed into diamond.

Natural and crystalline graphites are not often used in pure form as structural materials due to their shear-planes, brittleness and inconsistent mechanical properties.

In its pure glassy (isotropic) synthetic forms, pyrolytic graphite and carbon fiber graphite are extremely strong, heat-resistant (to 3000 °C) materials, used in reentry shields for missile nosecones, solid rocket engines, high temperature reactors, brake shoes and electric motor brushes.

Intumescent or expandable graphites are used in fire seals, fitted around the perimeter of a fire door. During a fire the graphite intumesces (expands and chars) to resist fire penetration and prevent the spread of fumes. A typical start expansion temperature (SET) is between 150 and 300 °C.

Graphite's specific gravity is 2.3, which makes it less dense than diamond.

Graphite is slightly more reactive than diamond. This is because the reactants are able to penetrate between the hexagonal layers of carbon atoms in graphite. It is unaffected by ordinary solvents, dilute acids, or fused alkalis. However, chromic acid oxidizes it to carbon dioxide.

=== Graphene ===
A single layer of graphite is called graphene and has extraordinary electrical, thermal, and physical properties. It can be produced by epitaxy on an insulating or conducting substrate or by mechanical exfoliation (repeated peeling) from graphite. Its applications may include replacing silicon in high-performance electronic devices. With two layers stacked, bilayer graphene results with different properties.

=== Lonsdaleite (hexagonal diamond) ===
Lonsdaleite is an allotrope sometimes called "hexagonal diamond", formed from graphite present in meteorites upon their impact on the earth. The great heat and pressure of the impact transforms the graphite into a denser form similar to diamond but retaining graphite's hexagonal crystal lattice. "Hexagonal diamond" has also been synthesized in the laboratory, by compressing and heating graphite either in a static press or using explosives. It can also be produced by the thermal decomposition of a polymer, poly(hydridocarbyne), at atmospheric pressure, under inert gas atmosphere (e.g. argon, nitrogen), starting at temperature 110 °C (230 °F).

=== Graphenylene ===
Graphenylene is a single layer carbon material with biphenylene-like subunits as basis in its hexagonal lattice structure. It is also known as biphenylene-carbon.

=== Carbophene ===
Carbophene is a 2 dimensional covalent organic framework. 4-6 carbophene has been synthesized from 1-3-5 trihydroxybenzene. It consists of 4-carbon and 6-carbon rings in 1:1 ratio. The angles between the three σ-bonds of the orbitals are approximately 120°, 90°, and 150°.

=== AA'-graphite ===
AA'-graphite is an allotrope of carbon similar to graphite, but where the layers are positioned differently to each other as compared to the order in graphite.

=== Diamane ===
Diamane is a 2D form of diamond. It can be made via high pressures, but without that pressure, the material reverts to graphene. Another technique is to add hydrogen atoms, but those bonds are weak. Using fluorine (xenon-difluoride) instead brings the layers closer together, strengthening the bonds. This is called f-diamane.

== Amorphous carbon ==
Amorphous carbon is the name used for carbon that does not have any crystalline structure. As with all glassy materials, some short-range order can be observed, but there is no long-range pattern of atomic positions. While entirely amorphous carbon can be produced, most amorphous carbon contains microscopic crystals of graphite-like, or even diamond-like carbon.

Coal and soot or carbon black are informally called amorphous carbon. However, they are products of pyrolysis (the process of decomposing a substance by the action of heat), which does not produce true amorphous carbon under normal conditions.

== Nanocarbons ==
=== Buckminsterfullerenes ===
The buckminsterfullerenes, or usually just fullerenes or buckyballs for short, were discovered in 1985 by a team of scientists from Rice University and the University of Sussex, three of whom were awarded the 1996 Nobel Prize in Chemistry. They are named for the resemblance to the geodesic structures devised by Richard Buckminster "Bucky" Fuller. Fullerenes are positively curved molecules of varying sizes composed entirely of carbon, which take the form of a hollow sphere, ellipsoid, or tube (the C60 version has the same form as a traditional stitched soccer ball).

As of the early twenty-first century, the chemical and physical properties of fullerenes are still under heavy study, in both pure and applied research labs. In April 2003, fullerenes were under study for potential medicinal use — binding specific antibiotics to the structure to target resistant bacteria and even target certain cancer cells such as melanoma.

=== Nanotubes ===
Carbon nanotubes, also called buckytubes, are cylindrical carbon molecules with novel properties that make them potentially useful in a wide variety of applications (e.g., nano-electronics, optics, materials applications, etc.). They exhibit extraordinary strength, unique electrical properties, and are efficient conductors of heat. Non-carbon nanotubes have also been synthesized. Carbon nanotubes are a members of the fullerene structural family, which also includes buckyballs. Whereas buckyballs are spherical in shape, a nanotube is cylindrical, with at least one end typically capped with a hemisphere of the buckyball structure. Their name is derived from their size, since the diameter of a nanotube is on the order of a few nanometers (approximately 50,000 times smaller than the width of a human hair), while they can be up to several centimeters in length. There are two main types of nanotubes: single-walled nanotubes (SWNTs) and multi-walled nanotubes (MWNTs).

=== Nanobuds ===
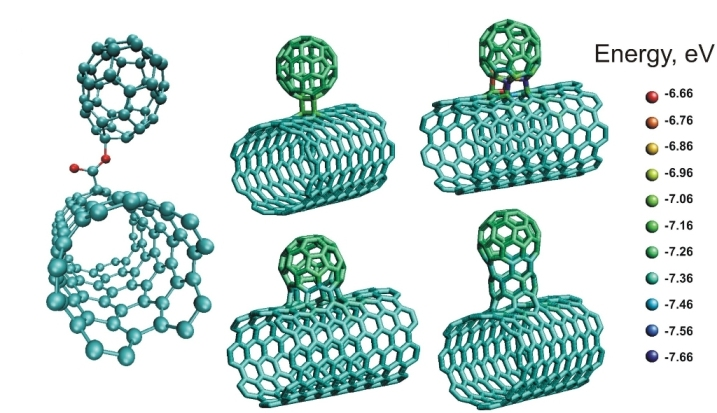
Computer models of stable nanobud structures

Carbon nanobuds are a newly discovered allotrope of carbon in which fullerene like "buds" are covalently attached to the outer sidewalls of the carbon nanotubes. This hybrid material has useful properties of both fullerenes and carbon nanotubes. For instance, they have been found to be exceptionally good field emitters.

=== Nanolattices ===
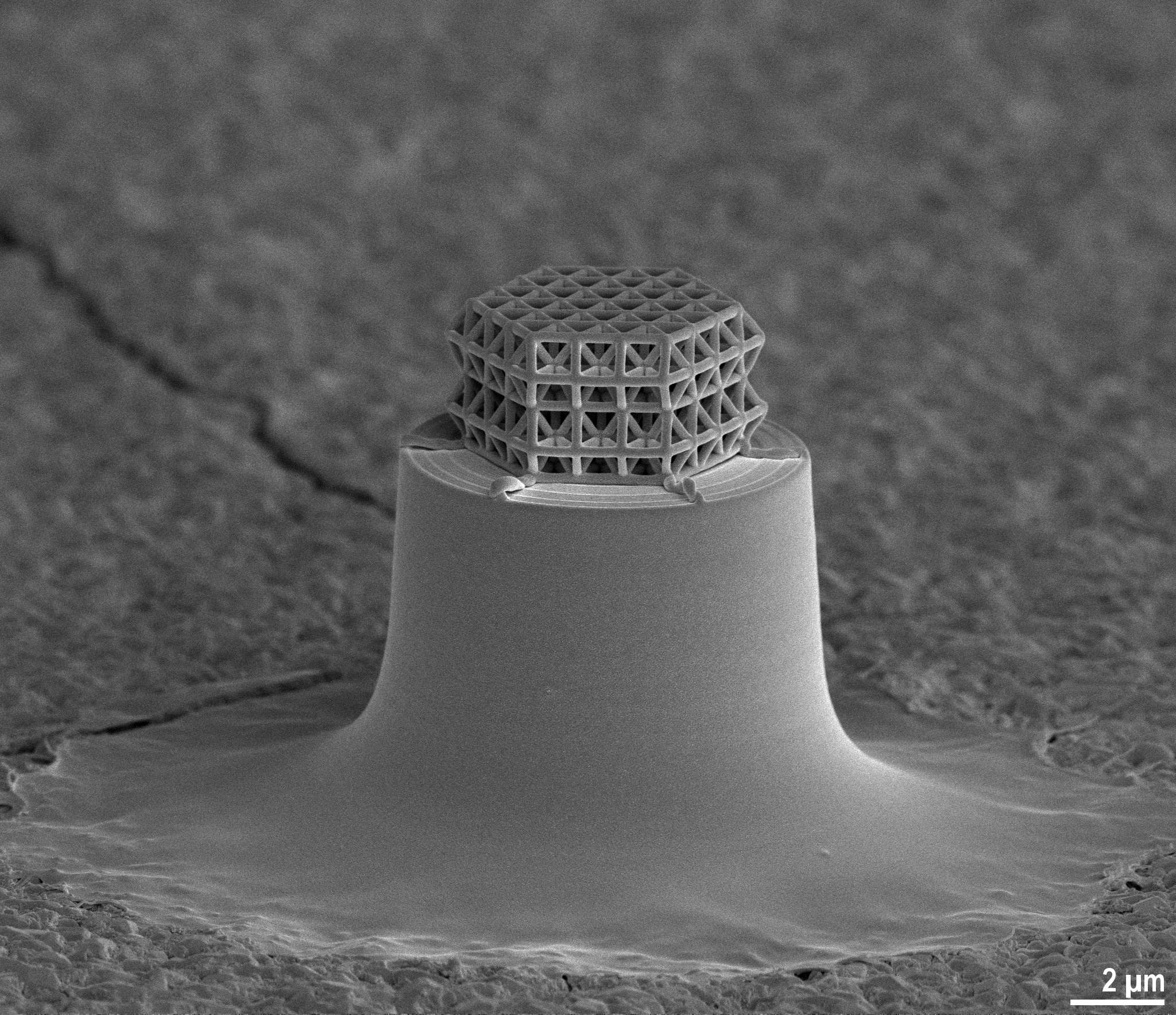
Scanning electron micrograph of an ultra-strong yet lightweight 3D printed carbon nanolattice.

A nanolattice is a synthetic porous material consisting of nanometer-size members patterned into an ordered lattice structure, like a space frame. The nanolattice is a material class that emerged after 2015. Nanolattices redefine the limits of the material property space. Despite consisting of 50-99% air, nanolattices are mechanically robust because they take advantage of size-dependent properties generally seen in nanoparticles, nanowires, and thin films. The most typical mechanical properties of nanolattices include strength, damage tolerance, and stiffness. Thus, nanolattices have a wide range of potential applications.

=== Schwarzites ===
Schwarzites are negatively curved carbon surfaces originally proposed by decorating triply periodic minimal surfaces with carbon atoms. The geometric topology of the structure is determined by the presence of ring defects, such as heptagons and octagons, to graphene's hexagonal lattice. (Negative curvature bends surfaces outwards like a saddle rather than bending inwards like a sphere.)

Recent work has proposed zeolite-templated carbons (ZTCs) may be schwarzites. The name, ZTC, derives from their origin inside the pores of zeolites, crystalline silicon dioxide minerals. A vapor of carbon-containing molecules is injected into the zeolite, where the carbon gathers on the pores' walls, creating the negative curve. Dissolving the zeolite leaves the carbon. A team generated structures by decorating the pores of a zeolite with carbon through a Monte Carlo method. Some of the resulting models resemble schwarzite-like structures.

== Glassy carbon ==
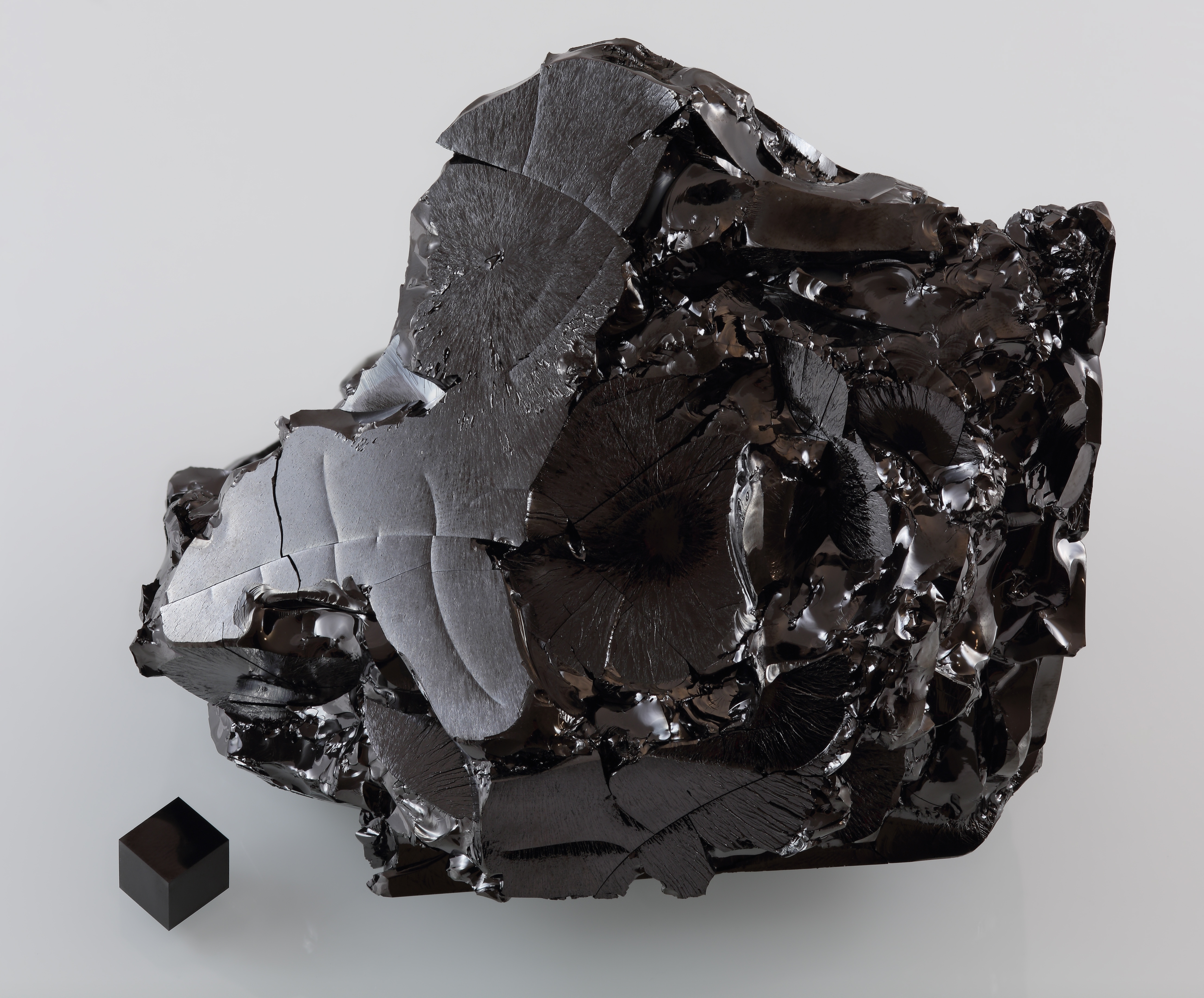
A large sample of glassy carbon.

Glassy carbon or vitreous carbon is a class of non-graphitizing carbon widely used as an electrode material in electrochemistry, as well as for high-temperature crucibles and as a component of some prosthetic devices.

It was first produced by Bernard Redfern in the mid-1950s at the laboratories of The Carborundum Company, Manchester, UK. He had set out to develop a polymer matrix to mirror a diamond structure and discovered a resole (phenolic) resin that would, with special preparation, set without a catalyst. Using this resin, the first glassy carbon was produced.

The preparation of glassy carbon involves subjecting the organic precursors to a series of heat treatments at temperatures up to 3000 °C. Unlike many non-graphitizing carbons, they are impermeable to gases and are chemically extremely inert, especially those prepared at very high temperatures. It has been demonstrated that the rates of oxidation of certain glassy carbons in oxygen, carbon dioxide or water vapor are lower than those of any other carbon. They are also highly resistant to attack by acids. Thus, while normal graphite is reduced to a powder by a mixture of concentrated sulfuric and nitric acids at room temperature, glassy carbon is unaffected by such treatment, even after several months.

== Carbon nanofoam ==
Carbon nanofoam is the fifth known allotrope of carbon, discovered in 1997 by Andrei V. Rode and co-workers at the Australian National University in Canberra. It consists of a low-density cluster-assembly of carbon atoms strung together in a loose three-dimensional web.

Each cluster is about 6 nanometers wide and consists of about 4000 carbon atoms linked in graphite-like sheets that are given negative curvature by the inclusion of heptagons among the regular hexagonal pattern. This is the opposite of what happens in the case of buckminsterfullerenes, in which carbon sheets are given positive curvature by the inclusion of pentagons.

The large-scale structure of carbon nanofoam is similar to that of an aerogel, but with 1% of the density of previously produced carbon aerogels – only a few times the density of air at sea level. Unlike carbon aerogels, carbon nanofoam is a poor electrical conductor.

== Carbide-derived carbon ==
Carbide-derived carbon (CDC) is a family of carbon materials with different surface geometries and carbon ordering that are produced via selective removal of metals from metal carbide precursors, such as TiC, SiC, Ti_{3}AlC_{2}, Mo_{2}C, etc. This synthesis is accomplished using chlorine treatment, hydrothermal synthesis, or high-temperature selective metal desorption under vacuum. Depending on the synthesis method, carbide precursor, and reaction parameters, multiple carbon allotropes can be achieved, including endohedral particles composed of predominantly amorphous carbon, carbon nanotubes, epitaxial graphene, nanocrystalline diamond, onion-like carbon, and graphitic ribbons, barrels, and horns. These structures exhibit high porosity and specific surface areas, with highly tunable pore diameters, making them promising materials for supercapacitor-based energy storage, water filtration and capacitive desalinization, catalyst support, and cytokine removal.

Other metastable carbon phases, some diamondlike, have been produced from reactions of SiC or CH3SiCl3 with CF4.

== Linear acetylenic carbon ==
A one-dimensional carbon polymer with the structure —(C≡C)_{n}—. Its structure is relatively like that of amorphous carbon.

== Cyclocarbons ==
Cyclo[18]carbon (C_{18}) was synthesized in 2019.

== Other possible allotropes ==
Many other allotropes have been hypothesized but have yet to be synthesized.

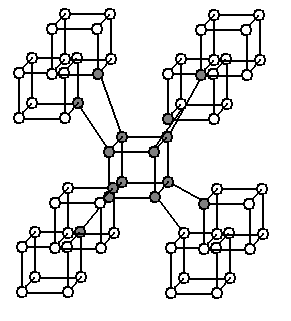
- Crystal structure of the proposed C_{8} cubic form of carbon
  bcc-carbon: At ultrahigh pressures of above 1000 GPa, diamond is predicted to transform into a body-centered cubic structure. This phase has importance in astrophysics and deep interiors of planets like Uranus and Neptune. Various structures have been proposed. Superdense and superhard material resembling this phase was synthesized and published in 1979 and reported to have the Im3̅ space group with eight atoms per primitive unit cell (16 atoms per conventional unit cell). Claims were made that the so-called C_{8} structure had been synthesized, having eight-carbon cubes similar to cubane in the Im3̅m space group, with eight atoms per primitive unit cell, or 16 atoms per conventional unit cell (also called supercubane, see illustration to the right). But a paper in 1988 claimed that a better theory was that the structure was the same as that of an allotrope of silicon called Si-III or γ-silicon, the so-called BC8 structure with space group Ia3̅ and 8 atoms per primitive unit cell (16 atoms per conventional unit cell). In 2008 it was reported that the cubane-like structure had been identified. A paper in 2012 considered four proposed structures, the supercubane structure, the BC8 structure, a structure with clusters of four carbon atoms in tetrahedra in space group I4̅3m having four atoms per primitive unit cell (eight per conventional unit cell), and a structure the authors called "carbon sodalite". They found in favor of this carbon sodalite structure, with a calculated density of 2.927 g/cm^{3}, shown in the upper left of the illustration under the abstract. This structure has just six atoms per primitive unit cell (twelve per conventional unit cell). The carbon atoms are in the same locations as the silicon and aluminum atoms of the mineral sodalite. The space group, I4̅3m, is the same as the fully expanded form of sodalite would have if sodalite had just silicon or just aluminum.
- bct-carbon: Body-centered tetragonal carbon was proposed by theorists in 2010.
- Chaoite is a mineral believed to have been formed in meteorite impacts. It has been described as slightly harder than graphite with a reflection color of grey to white. However, the existence of carbyne phases is disputed – see the article on chaoite for details.
- D-carbon: D-carbon was proposed by theorists in 2018. D-carbon is an orthorhombic sp^{3} carbon allotrope (6 atoms per cell). Total-energy calculations demonstrate that D-carbon is energetically more favorable than the previously proposed T_{6} structure (with 6 atoms per cell) as well as many others.
- Haeckelites: Ordered arrangements of pentagons, hexagons, and heptagons which can either be flat or tubular.

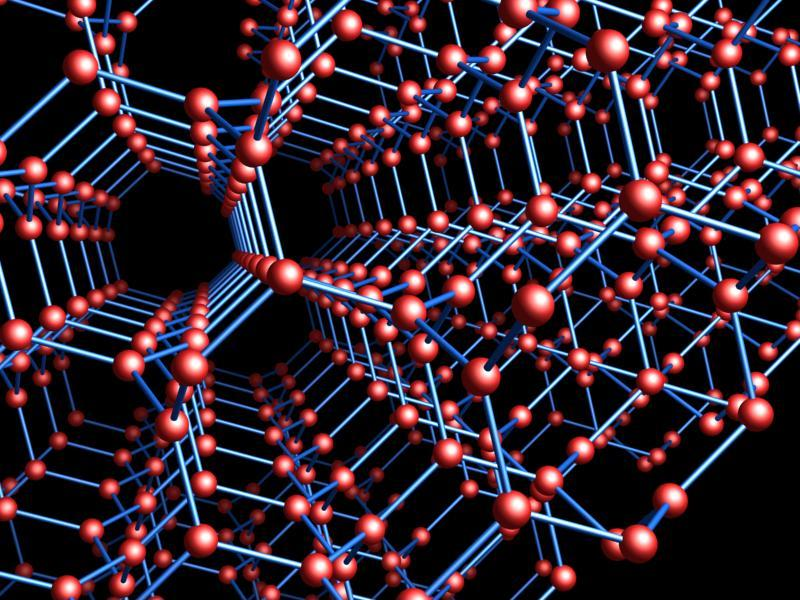
The K_{4} crystal

- The Laves graph or K_{4} crystal is a theoretically predicted three-dimensional crystalline metastable carbon structure in which each carbon atom is bonded to three others, at 120° angles (like graphite), but where the bond planes of adjacent layers lie at an angle of 70.5°, rather than coinciding.
- M-carbon: Monoclinic C-centered carbon is thought to have been first created in 1963 by compressing graphite at room temperature. Its structure was theorized in 2006, then in 2009 it was related to those experimental observations. Many structural candidates, including bct-carbon, were proposed to be equally compatible with experimental data available at the time, until in 2012 it was shown theoretically that this structure is kinetically the most likely to form from graphite. High-resolution data appeared shortly after, demonstrating that among all structure candidates only M-carbon is compatible with experiment.
- Metallic carbon: Theoretical studies have shown that there are regions in the phase diagram, at extremely high pressures, where carbon has metallic character. Laser shock experiments and theory indicate that above 600 GPa liquid carbon is metallic.
- Novamene: A combination of both hexagonal diamond and sp^{2} hexagons as in graphene.
- Phagraphene: Graphene-like allotrope with distorted Dirac cones.
- Prismane C_{8} is a theoretically predicted metastable carbon allotrope comprising an atomic cluster of eight carbon atoms, with the shape of an elongated triangular bipyramid—a six-atom triangular prism with two more atoms above and below its bases.
- Protomene: A hexagonal crystal structure with a fully relaxed primitive cell involving 48 atoms. Out of these, 12 atoms have the potential to switch hybridization between sp^{2} and sp^{3}, forming dimers.
- Q-carbon: Ferromagnetic carbon was discovered in 2015.
- T-carbon: Every carbon atom in diamond is replaced with a carbon tetrahedron (hence 'T-carbon'). This was proposed by theorists in 1985.
- There is evidence that white dwarf stars have a core of crystallized carbon and oxygen nuclei. The largest of these found in the universe so far, BPM 37093, is located 50 light-years (4.7×10^{14} km) away in the constellation Centaurus. A news release from the Harvard-Smithsonian Center for Astrophysics described the 2,500-mile (4,000 km)-wide stellar core as a diamond, and it was named as Lucy, after the Beatles' song "Lucy in the Sky With Diamonds"; however, it is more likely an exotic form of carbon. Penta-graphene is a predicted carbon allotrope that utilizes the Cairo pentagonal tiling.
- U carbon is predicted to consist of corrugated layers tiled with six- or 12-atom rings, linked by covalent bonds. Notably, it can be harder than steel, as conductive as stainless steel, highly reflective and ferromagnetic, behaving as a permanent magnet at temperatures up to 125 °C.
- Zayedene: A combination of linear sp carbon chains and sp3 bulk carbon. The structure of these crystalline carbon allotropes consists of sp chains inserted in cylindrical cavities periodically arranged in hexagonal diamond (lonsdaleite).

== Variability of carbon ==
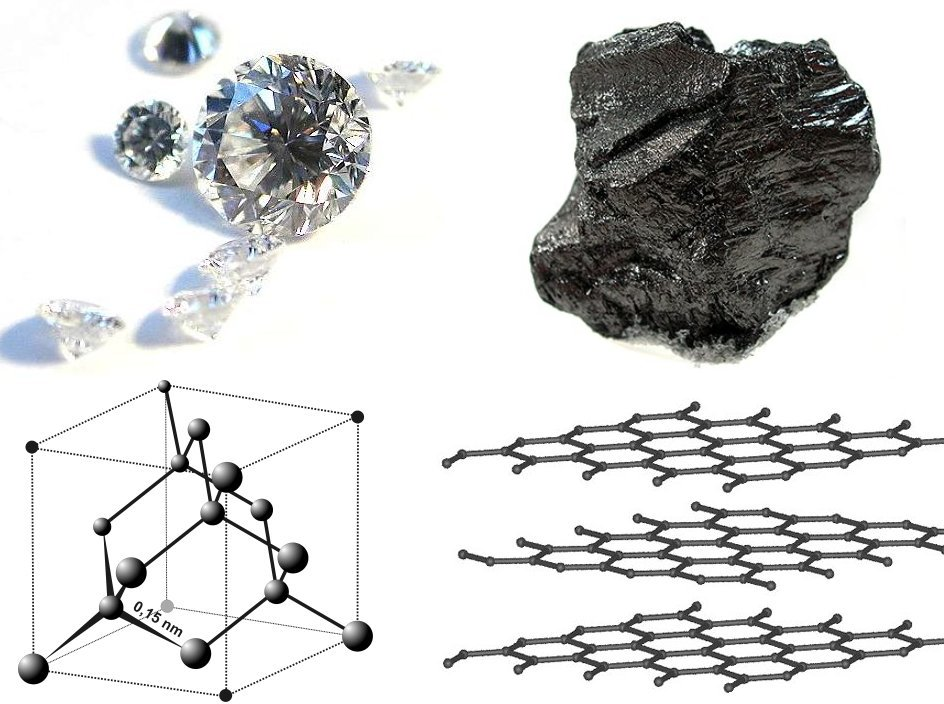
Diamond and graphite are two allotropes of carbon: pure forms of the same element that differ in structure.

The system of carbon allotropes spans an astounding range of extremes, considering that they are all merely structural formations of the same element.

Between diamond and graphite:

- Diamond crystallizes in the cubic system but graphite crystallizes in the hexagonal system.
- Diamond is clear and transparent, but graphite is black and opaque.
- Diamond is the hardest mineral known (10 on the Mohs scale), but graphite is one of the softest (1–2 on Mohs scale).
- Diamond is the ultimate abrasive, but graphite is soft and is a very good lubricant.
- Diamond is an excellent electrical insulator, but graphite is an excellent conductor.
- Diamond is an excellent thermal conductor, but some forms of graphite are used for thermal insulation (for example heat shields and firebreaks).
- At standard temperature and pressure, graphite is the thermodynamically stable form. Thus diamonds do not exist forever. The conversion from diamond to graphite, however, has a very high activation energy and is therefore extremely slow.

Despite the hardness of diamonds, the chemical bonds that hold the carbon atoms in diamonds together are actually weaker than those that hold together graphite. The difference is that in diamond, the bonds form an inflexible three-dimensional lattice. In graphite, the atoms are tightly bonded into sheets, but the sheets can slide easily over each other, making graphite soft.

== See also ==
- Superdense carbon allotropes
