= Haeckel (disambiguation) =

Ernst Haeckel (1834–1919) was a German zoologist.

Haeckel or Häckel may also refer to:

== People ==
- Anton Haeckl (fl. 18th century), Austrian musical instrument builder
- Ernst Haeckel (general) (1890–1967), German general
- František Häckel, Czech cross-country skier
- Stephan H. Haeckel (born 1936), American management theorist

== Science ==
- 12323 Haeckel, a minor planet named after Ernst Haeckel
- Haeckelites, family of hypothetical carbon allotropes

=== Biology ===
- Haeckelia, a genus of ctenophores in the family in the order Cydippida
- Haeckel's law, a version of the recapitulation theory in biology

== Other uses ==
- Ernst-Haeckel-Haus, building in Jena, Germany
- Haeckel Peak, mountain in New Zealand
- Mount Haeckel, mountain summit in northern California, United States

== See also ==
- Hackel
- Hackl
- Haeckel's Tale
