= Häcki =

Häcki is a surname. Notable people with the surname include:

- Caroline Häcki (born 1982), Swiss dressage rider
- Lena Häcki (born 1995), Swiss biathlete

== See also ==
- Hackl
