= Carbon nanobud =

Synthetic allotrope of carbon combining carbon nanotube and a fullerene

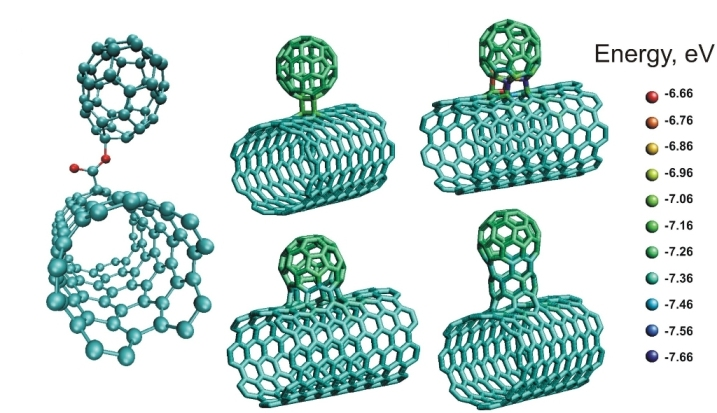
Computer models of several stable nanobud structures

In situ observation of a carbon nanobud by transmission electron microscopy

Capture of an additional fullerene molecule by a nanobud

Generation of fullerene molecules (carbon peapod) inside a nanobud

In nanotechnology, a carbon nanobud is a material that combines carbon nanotubes and spheroidal fullerenes, both allotropes of carbon, forming "buds" attached to the tubes. Carbon nanobuds were discovered and synthesized in 2006.

In this material, fullerenes are bonded with covalent bonds to the outer sidewalls of the underlying nanotube. Consequently, nanobuds exhibit properties of carbon nanotubes and fullerenes. The mechanical properties and the electrical conductivity of the nanobuds are similar to those of carbon nanotubes.

Canatu Oyj, a Finnish company, claims the intellectual property rights for nanobuds, its synthesis processes, and several applications.

== Properties ==
Carbon nanobuds (CNBs) have some of the properties of carbon nanotubes, such as one-dimensional electrical conductivity, flexibility and manufacturing adaptability, as well as some of the chemical properties of fullerenes. Examples of these properties include ability to engage in cycloaddition reactions and can easily form the chemical bonds capable of attaching to other molecules with complex structures. CNBs have a much higher chemical activity than single-walled carbon nanotubes (SWCNTs).

=== Electrical properties ===
CNBs have been shown to have electronic properties that differ from those of fullerenes and carbon nanotubes (CNTs). CNBs exhibit lower field thresholds—the electric field strength required to extract electrons from the material through quantum tunnelling—as well as higher current densities and electric field emissions than SWCNTs. The chemical bonds between the nanotube's wall and the fullerenes on the surface can lead to charge transfer between the surfaces. The presence of fullerenes in CNBs leads to smaller bundle formation—the tendency to clump or pack together into rope-like structures—and higher chemical reactivity. CNBs can engage in cycloaddition reactions and form chemical bonds attaching molecules with complex structures, due to the greater availability of CNB surface to the reactants, the presence of π-conjugated structure and 5-atom rings with excess pirimidization energy, or the energy needed to distort an sp^{2}-hybridized atom into a pyramidal shape. Formation energy indicates that the preparation of CNBs are endothermic, meaning that they are not favorable to create.

All CNBs can conduct electricity, regardless of whether the single-walled CNT is a metallic or semiconducting base. The band gap of carbon nanobuds are not constant. They can change with the size of the fullerene group. The attachment of C_{60} added to the armchair orientation of the SWCNT opens up the band gap. On the other hand, adding it to a semiconducting SWCNT could introduce impurity states to the band gap, which would reduce the band gap. The band gap of CNBs can also be modified by changing the density of the carbons of the C_{60} attached to the sidewall of the SWCNT.

=== Magnetic properties ===
Two structures of CNBs are ferromagnetic in their ground state, and two are nonmagnetic. The attached C_{60} molecule on the surface of the CNTs gives more space between the nanotubes—and adhesion between the single-walled CNTS can be weakened to prevent the formation of tight bundles of CNTs. Carbon nanobuds can be used as molecular support and act as "teeth" to prevent the matrix from slipping into composite materials and increasing their mechanical strength.

=== Structural properties ===
The stability of CNBs depends on the type of carbon bond that is dissociated in the cycloaddition. It has been shown that carbon atoms of the SWCNT near the fullerene C_{60} molecule were pulled outward from the original wall surface due to the covalent bonding with cycloaddition between the fullerene and nanotube; in addition, their bonding was transformed from sp^{2} to sp^{3} hybridization. An analysis using Raman scattering spectroscopy shows that the CNB sample had stronger chemical modification compared to CNTs. It indicates that there is a carbon sp^{3} hybridization that occurs after the chemical addition creation of CNBs.

== Synthesis ==
The single wall carbon nanotubes can react with fullerenes in the presence of water vapor or carbon dioxide. It produces a covalently linked material that looks similar to buds on a tree branch, hence the name "Nanobud".

The nanobuds form in abundance at 45ppm of water vapour and higher. However, above 365ppm, the reaction will give a higher number of inactive catalyst particles in lieu of the nanobud.

== See also ==
- Nanobud
