= Superdense carbon allotropes =

Proposed configurations of carbon atoms

Superdense carbon allotropes are proposed configurations of carbon atoms that result in a stable material with a higher density than diamond. Few hypothetical carbon allotropes denser than diamond are known. All these allotropes can be divided at two groups: the first are hypothetically stable at ambient conditions; the second are high-pressure carbon allotropes which become quasi-stable only at high pressure.

== Ambient conditions ==
According to the SACADA database, the first group comprises the structures, called hP3, tI12, st12, r8, I41/a, P41212, m32, m32*, t32, t32*, H-carbon and uni. Among them, st12 carbon was proposed as far as 1987 in the work of R. Biswas et al.

== High-pressure carbon ==
The following allotropes belong to the second group: MP8, OP8, SC4, BC-8 and (9,0). These are hypothetically quasi-stable at the high pressure. BC-8 carbon is not only a superdense allotrope but also one of the oldest hypothetical carbon structures; initially it was proposed in 1984 in the work R. Biswas et al. The MP8 structure proposed in the work J. Sun et al. is almost two times denser than diamond; its density is as high as 7.06 g/cm^{3} and it is the highest value reported so far.

== Band gaps ==
All hypothetical superdense carbon allotropes have dissimilar band gaps compared to the others. For example, SC4 is supposed to be a metallic allotrope while st12, m32, m32*, t32, t32* have band gaps larger than 5.0 eV.

== Carbon tetrahedra ==
These new materials would have structures based on carbon tetrahedra, and represent the densest of such structures. On the opposite end of the density spectrum is a recently theorized tetrahedral structure called T-carbon. This is obtained by replacing carbon atoms in diamond with carbon tetrahedra. In contrast to superdense allotropes, T-carbon would have very low density and hardness.
