= Hackel =

Hackel is the surname of several people:

- A. W. Hackel (1882 – 1959), American film producer
- Chris Hackel, (born 1987), Mauritian swimmer
- Dave Hackel, American television writer
- David Hackel, American television producer and writer
- Eduard Hackel (1850 – 1926), Austrian botanist
- Mark Hackel, County Executive of Macomb County, Michigan
- Paul Hackel, American politician
- Sergei Hackel (1931–2005), British Eastern Orthodox clergy

== See also ==
- Haeckel (disambiguation), both for Haeckel and Häckel
- Hackl
