= Carbon =

Carbon, _{6}C
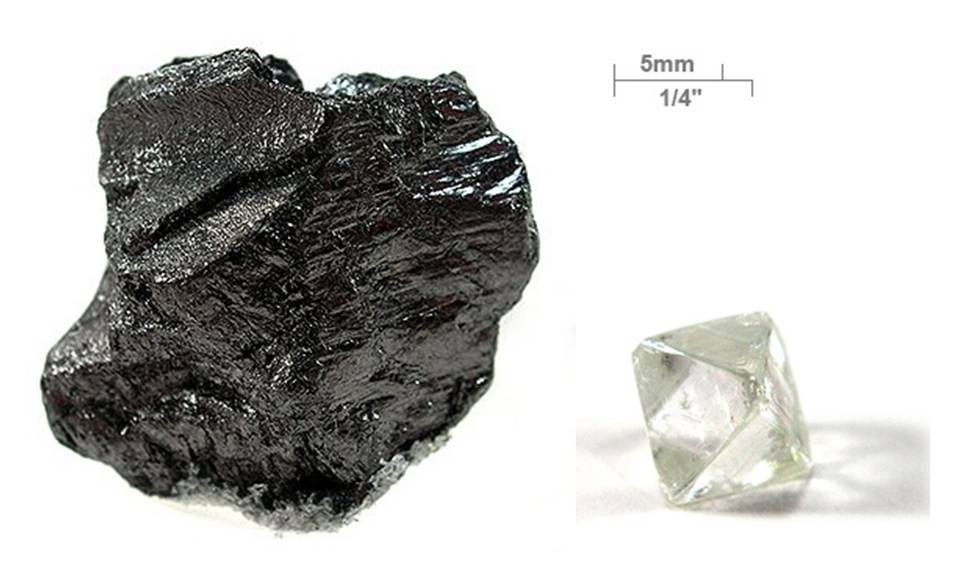
- Graphite (left) and diamond (right), two allotropes of carbon

Carbon
- Allotropes: graphite, diamond and more (see Allotropes of carbon)
- Appearance: graphite: black, metallic-looking; diamond: clear

Standard atomic weight A_{r}°(C)
- [12.0096, 12.0116]; 12.011±0.002 (abridged)

Carbon in the periodic table
Hydrogen																															Helium
Lithium	Beryllium																									Boron	Carbon	Nitrogen	Oxygen	Fluorine	Neon
Sodium	Magnesium																									Aluminium	Silicon	Phosphorus	Sulfur	Chlorine	Argon
Potassium	Calcium															Scandium	Titanium	Vanadium	Chromium	Manganese	Iron	Cobalt	Nickel	Copper	Zinc	Gallium	Germanium	Arsenic	Selenium	Bromine	Krypton
Rubidium	Strontium															Yttrium	Zirconium	Niobium	Molybdenum	Technetium	Ruthenium	Rhodium	Palladium	Silver	Cadmium	Indium	Tin	Antimony	Tellurium	Iodine	Xenon
Caesium	Barium	Lanthanum	Cerium	Praseodymium	Neodymium	Promethium	Samarium	Europium	Gadolinium	Terbium	Dysprosium	Holmium	Erbium	Thulium	Ytterbium	Lutetium	Hafnium	Tantalum	Tungsten	Rhenium	Osmium	Iridium	Platinum	Gold	Mercury (element)	Thallium	Lead	Bismuth	Polonium	Astatine	Radon
Francium	Radium	Actinium	Thorium	Protactinium	Uranium	Neptunium	Plutonium	Americium	Curium	Berkelium	Californium	Einsteinium	Fermium	Mendelevium	Nobelium	Lawrencium	Rutherfordium	Dubnium	Seaborgium	Bohrium	Hassium	Meitnerium	Darmstadtium	Roentgenium	Copernicium	Nihonium	Flerovium	Moscovium	Livermorium	Tennessine	Oganesson
–
↑
C
↓
Si
boron ← carbon → nitrogen
- Atomic number (Z): 6
- Group: group 14 (carbon group)
- Period: period 2
- Block: p-block
- Electron configuration: [He] 2s^{2} 2p^{2}
- Electrons per shell: 2, 4

Physical properties
- Phase at STP: solid
- Sublimation point: 3915 K (3642 °C, 6588 °F)
- Density (near r.t.): graphite: 2.266 g/cm^{3} diamond: 3.515 g/cm^{3} amorphous: 1.8–2.1 g/cm^{3}
- Triple point: 4600 K, 10,800 kPa
- Heat of fusion: graphite: 117 kJ/mol
- Molar heat capacity: 8.517 J/(mol·K) (graphite); 6.155 J/(mol·K) (diamond)
- Specific heat capacity: 709.1 J/(kg·K) (graphite)

Atomic properties
- Oxidation states: common: −4, −3, −2, −1, 0, +1, +2, +3, +4
- Electronegativity: Pauling scale: 2.55
- Ionization energies: 1st: 1086.5 kJ/mol; 2nd: 2352.6 kJ/mol; 3rd: 4620.5 kJ/mol; (more)
- Covalent radius: sp^{3}: 77 pm sp^{2}: 73 pm sp: 69 pm
- Van der Waals radius: 170 pm
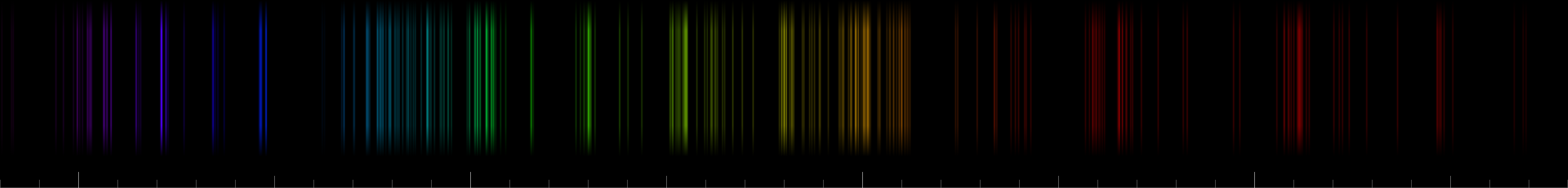
- Spectral lines of carbon

Other properties
- Natural occurrence: primordial
- Crystal structure: graphite: simple hexagonal (hP4)
- Lattice constants: a = 246.14 pm c = 670.94 pm (at 20 °C)
- Crystal structure: diamond: face-centered diamond-cubic (cF8)
- Lattice constant: a = 356.707 pm (at 20 °C)
- Thermal expansion: diamond: 0.8 µm/(m⋅K) (at 25 °C)
- Thermal conductivity: graphite: 119–165 W/(m⋅K) diamond: 900–2300 W/(m⋅K)
- Electrical resistivity: graphite: 7.837 µΩ⋅m
- Magnetic ordering: diamagnetic
- Molar magnetic susceptibility: diamond: −5.9×10^{−6} cm^{3}/mol
- Young's modulus: diamond: 1050 GPa
- Shear modulus: diamond: 478 GPa
- Bulk modulus: diamond: 442 GPa
- Speed of sound thin rod: diamond: 18,350 m/s (at 20 °C)
- Poisson ratio: diamond: 0.1
- Mohs hardness: graphite: 1–2 diamond: 10
- CAS Number: atomic carbon: 7440-44-0; graphite: 7782-42-5; diamond: 7782-40-3

History
- Naming: from the Latin carbo for coal and charcoal
- Discovery: Egyptians and Sumerians (3750 BCE)
- Recognized as an element by: Antoine Lavoisier (1789)

Isotopes of carbon
Main isotopes			Decay	
Isotope	abundance	half-life (t_{1/2})	mode	product
^{11}C	synth	20.34 min	β^{+}	^{11}B
^{12}C	98.9%	stable		
^{13}C	1.06%	stable		
^{14}C	trace	5.70×10^{3} y	β^{−}	^{14}N

Carbon (from Latin carbo 'coal') is a chemical element; it has symbol C and atomic number 6. It is nonmetallic and tetravalent—meaning that its atoms are able to form up to four covalent bonds due to its valence shell exhibiting 4 electrons. It belongs to group 14 of the periodic table. Carbon makes up about 0.025 percent of Earth's crust. Three isotopes occur naturally, ^{12}C and ^{13}C being stable, while ^{14}C is a radionuclide, decaying with a half-life of 5,700 years. Carbon is one of the few elements known since antiquity.

Carbon is the 15th most abundant element in the Earth's crust, and the fourth most abundant element in the universe by mass after hydrogen, helium, and oxygen. Carbon's abundance, its unique diversity of organic compounds, and its unusual ability to form polymers at the temperatures commonly encountered on Earth, enables it to serve as the common element of all known life. It is the second most abundant element in the human body by mass (about 18.5%) after oxygen.

The atoms of carbon can bond together in diverse ways, resulting in various allotropes of carbon. Well-known allotropes include graphite, diamond, amorphous carbon, and fullerenes. The physical properties of carbon vary widely with the allotropic form. For example, graphite is opaque and black, while diamond is highly transparent. Graphite is soft enough to form a streak on paper (hence its name, from the Greek verb "γράφειν" which means "to write"), while diamond is the hardest naturally occurring material known. Graphite is a good electrical conductor while diamond has a low electrical conductivity. Under normal conditions, diamond, carbon nanotubes, and graphene have the highest thermal conductivities of all known materials. All carbon allotropes are solids under normal conditions, with graphite being the most thermodynamically stable form at standard temperature and pressure. They are chemically resistant and require high temperature to react even with oxygen.

The most common oxidation state of carbon in inorganic compounds is +4, while +2 is found in carbon monoxide and transition metal carbonyl complexes. The largest sources of inorganic carbon are limestones, dolomites and carbon dioxide, but significant quantities occur in organic deposits of coal, peat, oil, and methane clathrates. Carbon forms a vast number of compounds, with over a hundred million having been described and indexed; and yet that number is still only a fraction of the number of theoretically possible compounds under standard conditions.

== Characteristics ==
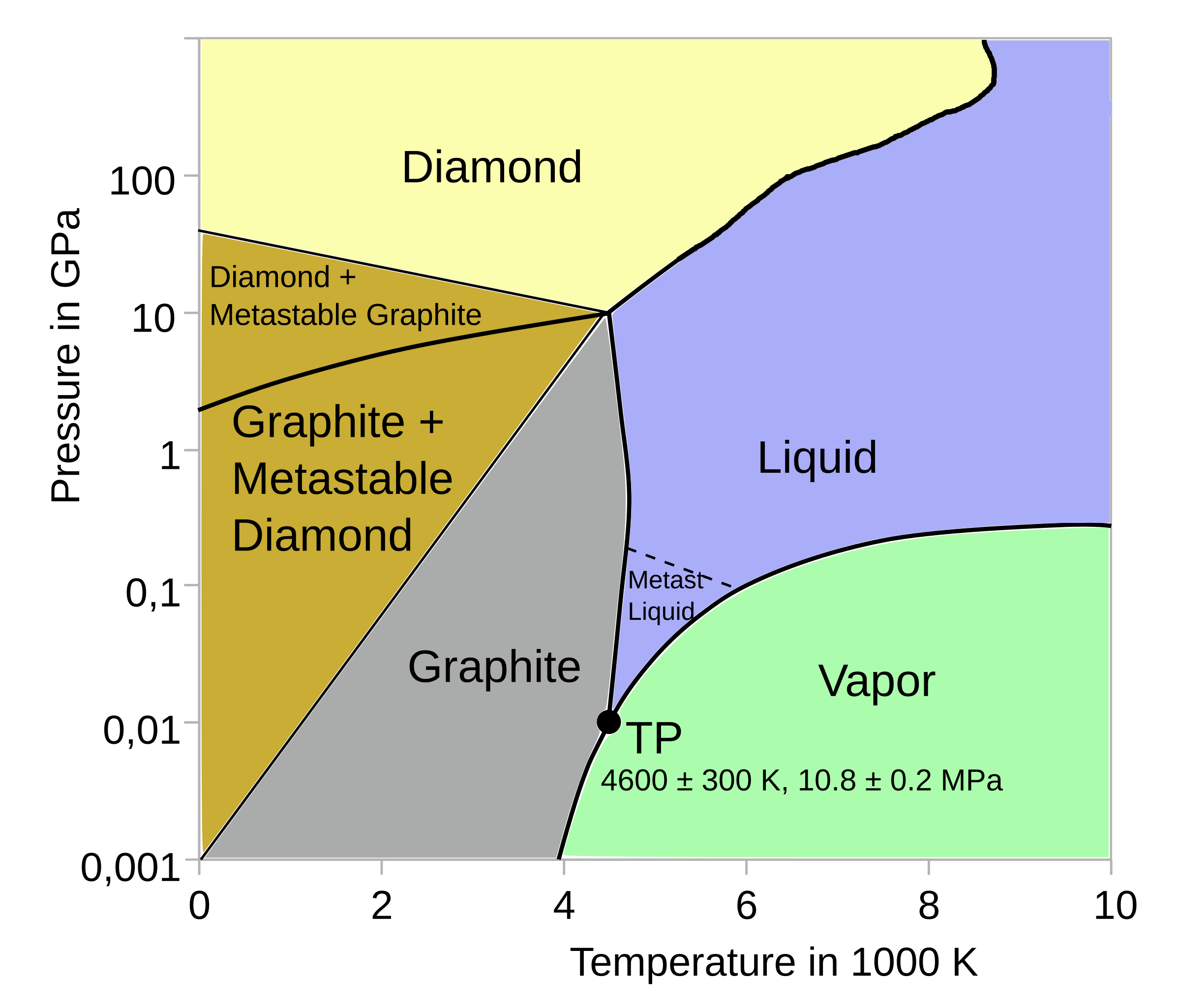
Theoretically predicted phase diagram of carbon, from 1989 and updated with newer work

Carbon in its solid state exists in several allotropes, including graphite, a soft, black, and slippery material, and diamond, the hardest naturally occurring substance. This variation in physical properties arises from differences in atomic arrangement: graphite consists of layers of hexagonally arranged carbon atoms, while diamond features a rigid three-dimensional lattice.

Chemically, carbon is notable for its ability to form stable chemical bonds with many elements, particularly with other carbon atoms, and is capable of forming multiple stable covalent bonds with suitable multivalent atoms. Carbon is a component element in the large majority of all chemical compounds, with about two hundred million examples having been described in the published chemical literature. Carbon also has the highest sublimation point of all elements. At atmospheric pressure it has no melting point, as its triple point is at 10.8 ± 0.2 megapascals (106.6 ± 2.0 atm; 1,566 ± 29 psi) and 4,600 ± 300 K (4,330 ± 300 °C; 7,820 ± 540 °F), so it sublimes at about 3,900 K (3,630 °C; 6,560 °F).

Compared to its well-known solid allotropes, the liquid and gaseous phases of carbon are far less studied. In the vapor phase, some of the carbon is in the form of highly reactive diatomic carbon (also known as dicarbon, with a chemical formula of C_{2}). When excited, this gas glows green. The liquid phase of carbon is a dark, mobile, and reflective liquid that can only exist above 4,000 K (3,730 °C; 6,740 °F) and under pressures exceeding 100 atmospheres.

Carbon is the sixth element, with a ground-state electron configuration of 1s^{2}2s^{2}2p^{2}, of which the four outer electrons are valence electrons. Its first four ionisation energies, 1086.5, 2352.6, 4620.5 and 6222.7 kJ/mol, are much higher than those of the heavier group-14 elements. The electronegativity of carbon is 2.5, significantly higher than the heavier group-14 elements (1.8–1.9), but close to most of the nearby nonmetals, as well as some of the second- and third-row transition metals. Carbon's covalent radii are normally taken as 77.2 pm (C−C), 66.7 pm (C=C) and 60.3 pm (C≡C), although these may vary depending on coordination number and what the carbon is bonded to. In general, covalent radius decreases with lower coordination number and higher bond order.

=== Chemical ===
Graphite is much more reactive than diamond at standard conditions, despite being more thermodynamically stable, as its delocalised pi system is much more vulnerable to attack. For example, graphite can be oxidised by hot concentrated nitric acid at standard conditions to mellitic acid, C_{6}(CO_{2}H)_{6}, which preserves the hexagonal units of graphite while breaking up the larger structure.

Carbon-based compounds form the basis of all known life on Earth, and the carbon-nitrogen-oxygen cycle provides a small portion of the energy produced by the Sun, and most of the energy in larger stars (e.g. Sirius). Although it forms an extraordinary variety of compounds, most forms of carbon are comparatively unreactive under normal conditions. At standard temperature and pressure, it resists all but the strongest oxidizers. It does not react with sulfuric acid, hydrochloric acid, chlorine or any alkalis. At elevated temperatures, carbon reacts with oxygen to form carbon oxides and will rob oxygen from metal oxides to leave the elemental metal. This exothermic reaction is used in the iron and steel industry to smelt iron and to control the carbon content of steel:

Fe_{3}O_{4} + 4 C_{(s)} + 2 O_{2} → 3 Fe_{(s)} + 4 CO_{2}_{(g)}.

Carbon reacts with sulfur to form carbon disulfide, and it reacts with steam in the coal-gas reaction used in coal gasification:

C_{(s)} + H_{2}O_{(g)} → CO_{(g)} + H_{2(g)}.

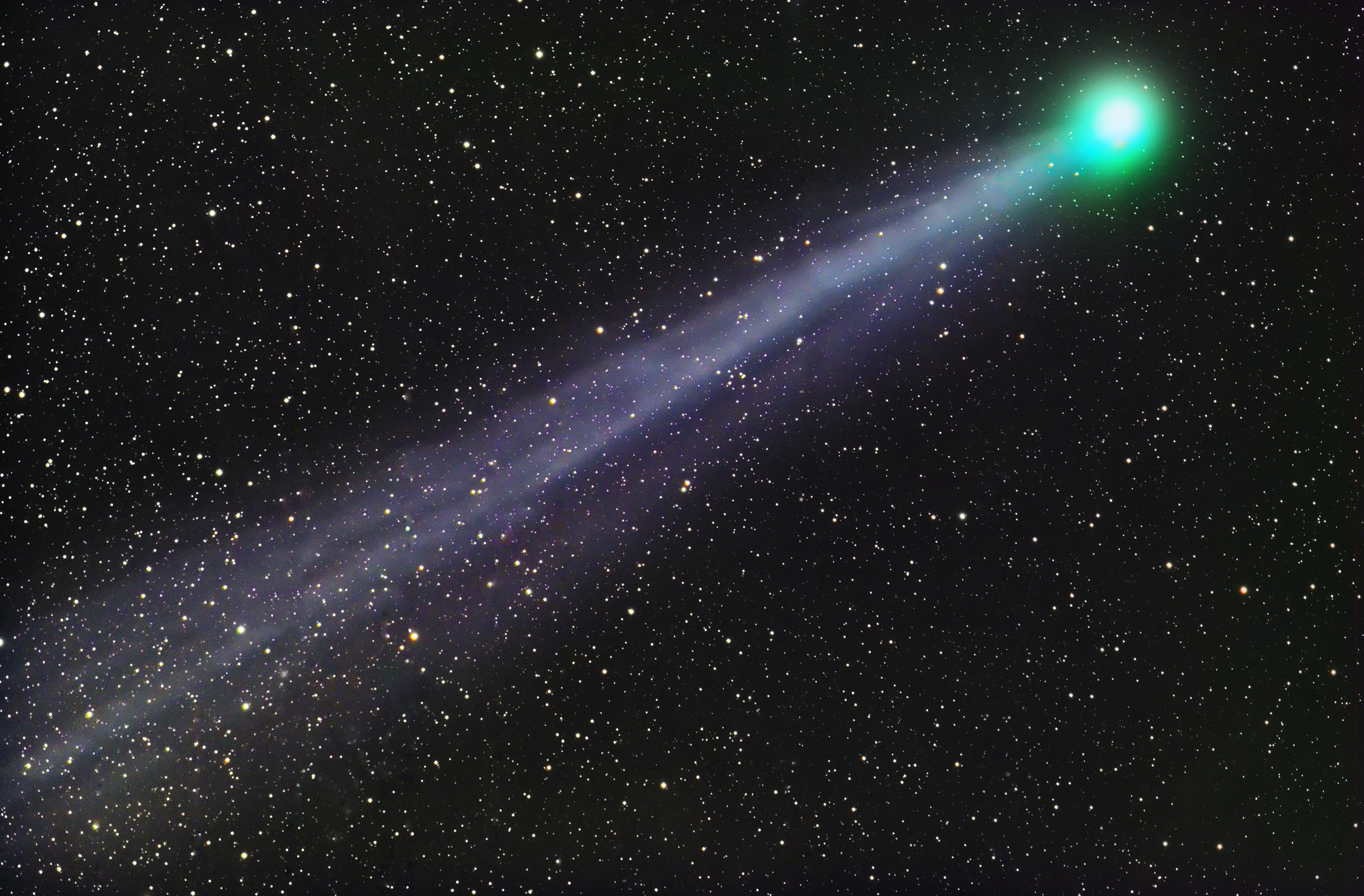
Comet C/2014 Q2 (Lovejoy) surrounded by glowing carbon vapor

Carbon combines with some metals at high temperatures to form metallic carbides, such as the iron carbide cementite in steel and tungsten carbide, widely used as an abrasive and for making hard tips for cutting tools.

=== Allotropes ===
Atomic carbon is a very short-lived species and, therefore, carbon is stabilized in various multi-atomic structures with diverse molecular configurations called allotropes. The three relatively well-known allotropes of carbon are amorphous carbon, graphite, and diamond. Once considered exotic, fullerenes are nowadays commonly synthesized and used in research; they include buckyballs, carbon nanotubes, carbon nanobuds and nanofibers. Several other exotic allotropes have also been discovered, such as lonsdaleite, glassy carbon, carbon nanofoam and linear acetylenic carbon (carbyne).

The system of carbon allotropes spans a range of extremes:

Graphite is one of the softest materials known.	Synthetic nanocrystalline diamond is the hardest material known.
Graphite is a very good lubricant, displaying superlubricity.	Diamond is the ultimate abrasive.
Graphite is a conductor of electricity.	Diamond is an excellent electrical insulator, and has the highest breakdown electric field of any known material.
Some forms of graphite are used for thermal insulation (i.e. firebreaks and heat shields), but some other forms are good thermal conductors.	Diamond is the best known naturally occurring thermal conductor.
Graphite is opaque.	Diamond is highly transparent.
Graphite crystallizes in the hexagonal system.	Diamond crystallizes in the cubic system.
Amorphous carbon is completely isotropic.	Carbon nanotubes are among the most anisotropic materials known.

Graphene is a two-dimensional sheet of carbon with the atoms arranged in a hexagonal lattice. As of 2009, graphene appears to be the strongest material ever tested. The process of separating it from graphite will require some further technological development before it is economical for industrial processes.

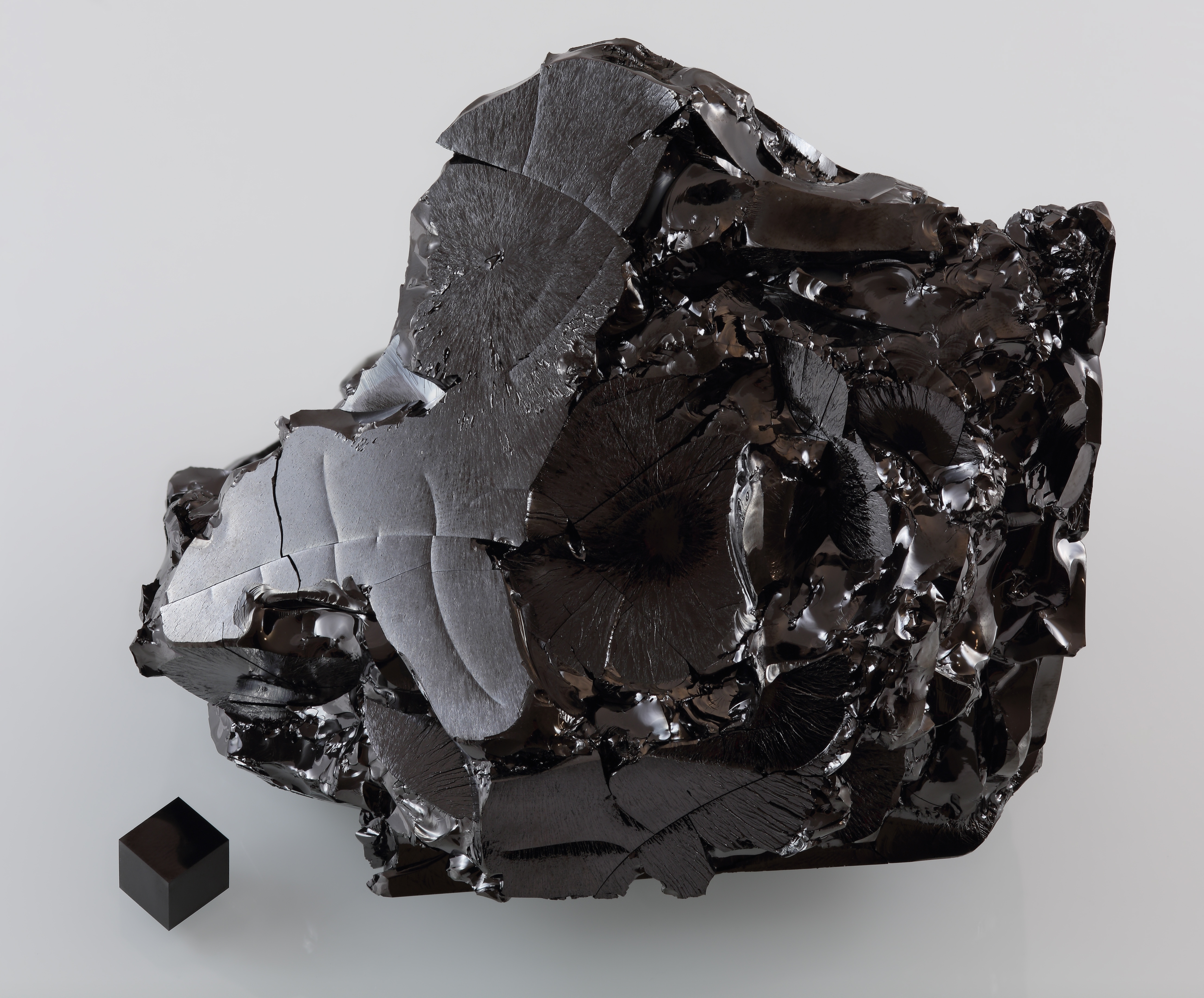
A large sample of glassy carbon

The amorphous form is an assortment of carbon atoms in a non-crystalline, irregular, glassy state, not held in a crystalline macrostructure. It is present as a powder, and is the main constituent of substances such as charcoal, lampblack (soot), and activated carbon. At normal pressures, carbon takes the form of graphite, in which each atom is bonded trigonally to three others in a plane composed of fused hexagonal rings, just like those in aromatic hydrocarbons. The resulting network is 2-dimensional, and the resulting flat sheets are stacked and loosely bonded through weak van der Waals forces. This gives graphite its softness and its cleaving properties (the sheets slip easily past one another). Because of the delocalization of one of the outer electrons of each atom to form a π-cloud, graphite conducts electricity, but only in the plane of each covalently bonded sheet. This results in a lower bulk electrical conductivity for carbon than for most metals. The delocalization also accounts for the energetic stability of graphite over diamond at room temperature.

Some allotropes of carbon: a) diamond; b) graphite; c) lonsdaleite; d–f) fullerenes (C_{60}, C_{540}, C_{70}); g) amorphous carbon; h) carbon nanotube

At very high pressures, carbon forms the more compact allotrope, diamond, having nearly twice the density of graphite. Here, each atom is bonded tetrahedrally to four others, forming a 3-dimensional network of puckered six-membered rings of atoms. Diamond has the same cubic structure as silicon and germanium, and because of the strength of the carbon-carbon bonds, it is the hardest naturally occurring substance measured by resistance to scratching. Contrary to the popular belief that "diamonds are forever", they are thermodynamically unstable (Δ_{f}G°(diamond, 298 K) = 2.9 kJ/mol) under normal conditions (298 K, 10^{5} Pa) and should theoretically transform into graphite. But due to a high activation energy barrier, the transition into graphite is so slow at normal temperature that it is unnoticeable. However, at very high temperatures diamond will turn into graphite, and diamonds can burn up in a house fire. The bottom left corner of the phase diagram for carbon has not been scrutinized experimentally. Although a computational study employing density functional theory methods reached the conclusion that as T → 0 K and p → 0 Pa, diamond becomes more stable than graphite by approximately 1.1 kJ/mol, more recent and definitive experimental and computational studies show that graphite is more stable than diamond for T < 400 K, without applied pressure, by 2.7 kJ/mol at T = 0 K and 3.2 kJ/mol at T = 298.15 K. Under some conditions, carbon crystallizes as lonsdaleite, a hexagonal crystal lattice with all atoms covalently bonded and properties similar to those of diamond.

Fullerenes are a synthetic crystalline formation with a graphite-like structure, but in place of flat hexagonal cells only, some of the cells of which fullerenes are formed may be pentagons, nonplanar hexagons, or even heptagons of carbon atoms. The sheets are thus warped into spheres, ellipses, or cylinders. The properties of fullerenes (split into buckyballs, buckytubes, and nanobuds) have not yet been fully analyzed and represent an intense area of research in nanomaterials. The names fullerene and buckyball are given after Richard Buckminster Fuller, popularizer of geodesic domes, which resemble the structure of fullerenes. The buckyballs are fairly large molecules formed completely of carbon bonded trigonally, forming spheroids (the best-known and simplest is the soccerball-shaped C_{60} buckminsterfullerene). Carbon nanotubes (buckytubes) are structurally similar to buckyballs, except that each atom is bonded trigonally in a curved sheet that forms a hollow cylinder. Nanobuds were first reported in 2007 and are hybrid buckytube/buckyball materials (buckyballs are covalently bonded to the outer wall of a nanotube) that combine the properties of both in a single structure.

Of the other discovered allotropes, carbon nanofoam is a ferromagnetic allotrope discovered in 1997. It consists of a low-density cluster-assembly of carbon atoms strung together in a loose three-dimensional web, in which the atoms are bonded trigonally in six- and seven-membered rings. It is among the lightest known solids, with a density of about 2 kg/m^{3}. Similarly, glassy carbon contains a high proportion of closed porosity, but contrary to normal graphite, the graphitic layers are not stacked like pages in a book, but have a more random arrangement. Linear acetylenic carbon has the chemical structure −(C≡C)_{n}− . Carbon in this modification is linear with sp orbital hybridization, and is a polymer with alternating single and triple bonds. This carbyne is of considerable interest to nanotechnology as its Young's modulus is 40 times that of the hardest known material – diamond.

In 2015, a team at the North Carolina State University announced the development of another allotrope they have dubbed Q-carbon, created by a high-energy low-duration laser pulse on amorphous carbon dust. Q-carbon is reported to exhibit ferromagnetism, fluorescence, and a hardness superior to diamonds.

=== Isotopes ===
Isotopes of carbon are atomic nuclei that contain six protons plus a number of neutrons (varying from 2 to 16). Carbon has two stable, naturally occurring isotopes. The isotope carbon-12 (^{12}C) forms 98.93% of the carbon on Earth, while carbon-13 (^{13}C) forms the remaining 1.07%. The concentration of ^{12}C is further increased in biological materials because biochemical reactions discriminate against ^{13}C. In 1961, the International Union of Pure and Applied Chemistry (IUPAC) adopted the isotope carbon-12 as the basis for atomic weights. Identification of carbon in nuclear magnetic resonance (NMR) experiments is done with the isotope ^{13}C.

Carbon-14 (^{14}C) is a naturally occurring radioisotope, created in the upper atmosphere (lower stratosphere and upper troposphere) by interaction of nitrogen with cosmic rays. It is found in trace amounts on Earth of 1 part per trillion (0.0000000001%) or more, mostly confined to the atmosphere and superficial deposits, particularly of peat and other organic materials. This isotope decays by 0.158 MeV β^{−} emission. Because of its relatively short half-life of 5700±30 years, ^{14}C is virtually absent in ancient rocks. The amount of ^{14}C in the atmosphere and in living organisms is almost constant, but decreases predictably in their bodies after death. This principle is used in radiocarbon dating, invented in 1949, which has been used extensively to determine the age of carbonaceous materials with ages up to about 40,000 years.

There are 15 known isotopes of carbon and the shortest-lived of these is ^{8}C which decays through proton emission and has a half-life of 3.5×10^{−21} s. The exotic ^{19}C exhibits a nuclear halo, which means its radius is appreciably larger than would be expected if the nucleus were a sphere of constant density.

== Occurrence ==
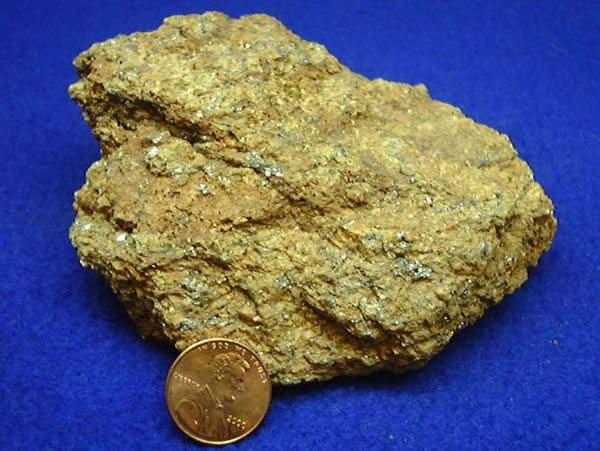
Graphite ore, shown with a penny for scale

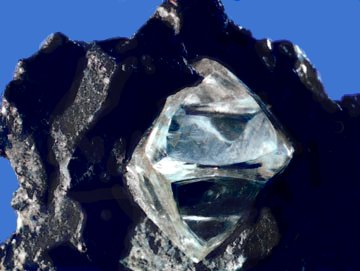
Raw diamond crystal

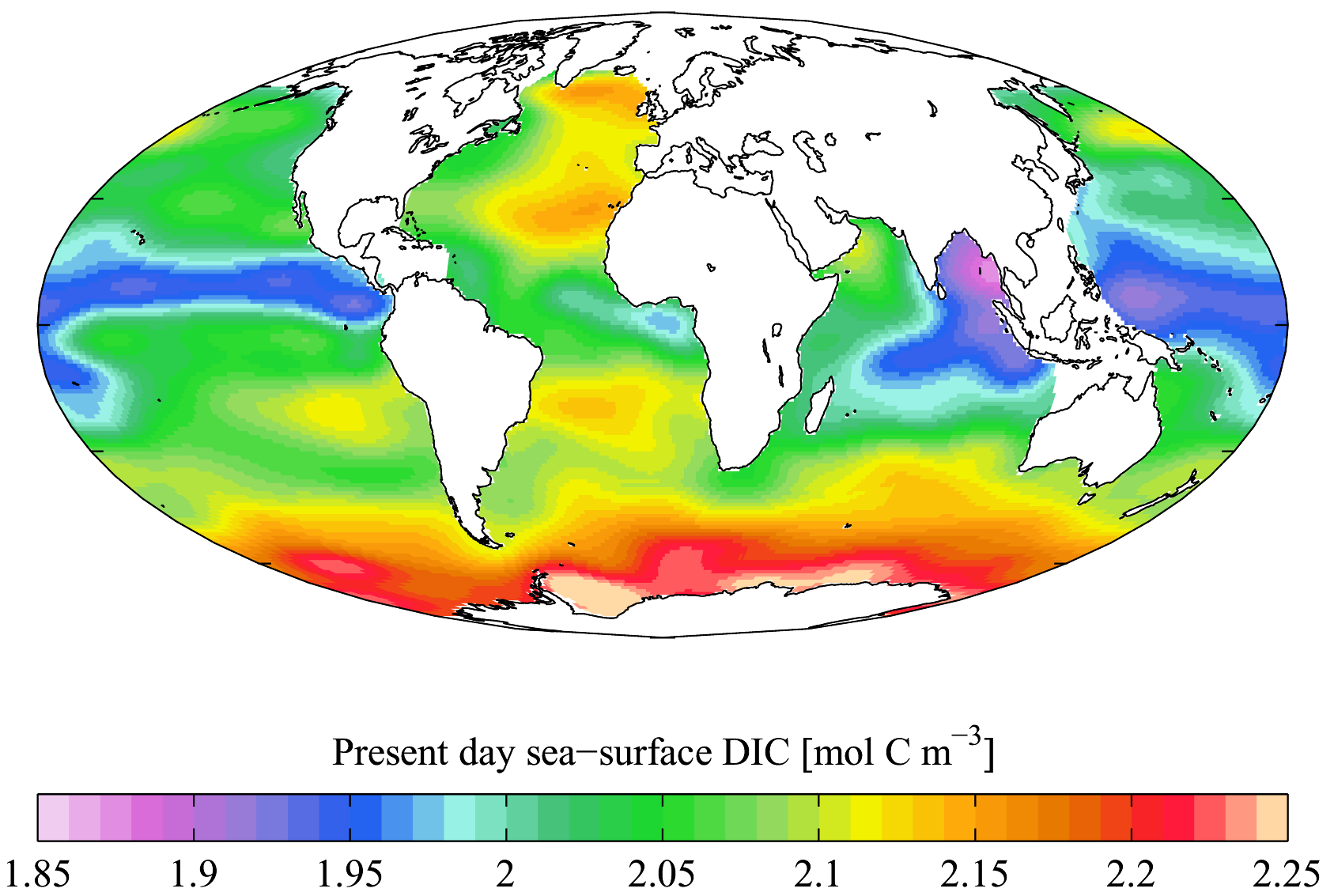
"Present day" (1990s) sea surface dissolved inorganic carbon concentration (from the GLODAP climatology)

Carbon is the fourth most abundant chemical element in the observable universe by mass after hydrogen, helium, and oxygen. Carbon is abundant in the Sun, stars, comets, and in the atmospheres of most planets. Some meteorites contain microscopic diamonds that were formed when the Solar System was still a protoplanetary disk. Microscopic diamonds may also be formed by the intense pressure and high temperature at the sites of meteorite impacts.

In 2014 NASA announced a greatly upgraded database for tracking polycyclic aromatic hydrocarbons (PAHs) in the universe. More than 20% of the carbon in the universe may be associated with PAHs, complex compounds of carbon and hydrogen without oxygen. These compounds figure in the PAH world hypothesis where they are hypothesized to have a role in abiogenesis and formation of life. PAHs seem to have been formed "a couple of billion years" after the Big Bang, are widespread throughout the universe, and are associated with new stars and exoplanets.

It has been estimated that the solid earth as a whole contains 730 ppm of carbon, with 2000 ppm in the core and 120 ppm in the combined mantle and crust. Since the mass of the earth is 5.972×10^{24} kg, this would imply 4360 million gigatonnes of carbon. This is much more than the amount of carbon in the oceans or atmosphere (below).

In combination with oxygen in carbon dioxide, carbon is found in the Earth's atmosphere (approximately 900 gigatonnes of carbon — each ppm corresponds to 2.13 Gt) and dissolved in all water bodies (approximately 36,000 gigatonnes of carbon). Carbon in the biosphere has been estimated at 550 gigatonnes but with a large uncertainty, due mostly to a huge uncertainty in the amount of terrestrial deep subsurface bacteria. Hydrocarbons (such as coal, petroleum, and natural gas) contain carbon as well. Coal "reserves" (not "resources") amount to around 900 gigatonnes with perhaps 18,000 Gt of resources. Oil reserves are around 150 gigatonnes. Proven sources of natural gas are about 175×10^{12} cubic metres (containing about 105 gigatonnes of carbon), but studies estimate another 900×10^{12} cubic metres of "unconventional" deposits such as shale gas, representing about 540 gigatonnes of carbon.

Carbon is also found in methane hydrates in polar regions and under the seas. Various estimates put this carbon between 500, 2500, or 3,000 Gt.

According to one source, in the period from 1751 to 2008 about 347 gigatonnes of carbon were released as carbon dioxide to the atmosphere from burning of fossil fuels. Another source puts the amount added to the atmosphere for the period since 1750 at 879 Gt, and the total going to the atmosphere, sea, and land (such as peat bogs) at almost 2,000 Gt.

Carbon is a constituent (about 12% by mass) of the very large masses of carbonate rock (limestone, dolomite, marble, and others). Coal is very rich in carbon (anthracite contains 92–98%) and is the largest commercial source of mineral carbon, accounting for 4,000 gigatonnes or 80% of fossil fuel.

As for individual carbon allotropes, graphite is found in large quantities in China, Russia, Mexico, Canada, and India. Natural diamonds occur in the rock kimberlite, found in ancient volcanic "necks", or "pipes". Most diamond deposits are in Africa, notably in South Africa, Namibia, Botswana, the Republic of the Congo, and Angola. Diamond deposits have also been found in Arkansas, Canada, the Russian Arctic, Brazil, and in Northern and Western Australia. Diamonds are found naturally, but about 90% of all industrial diamonds used in the U.S. are now manufactured.

Carbon-14 is formed in upper layers of the troposphere and the stratosphere at altitudes of 9–15 km by a reaction that is precipitated by cosmic rays. Thermal neutrons are produced that collide with the nuclei of nitrogen-14, forming carbon-14 and a proton. As such, 1.5%×10^{−10} of atmospheric carbon dioxide contains carbon-14.

Carbon-rich asteroids are relatively preponderant in the outer parts of the asteroid belt in the Solar System. These asteroids have not yet been directly sampled by scientists. The asteroids can be used in hypothetical space-based carbon mining, which may be possible in the future, but is currently technologically impossible.

=== Formation in stars ===
Formation of the carbon atomic nucleus occurs within a giant or supergiant star through the triple-alpha process. This requires a nearly simultaneous collision of three alpha particles (helium nuclei), as the products of further nuclear fusion reactions of helium with hydrogen or another helium nucleus produce lithium-5 and beryllium-8 respectively, both of which are highly unstable and decay almost instantly back into smaller nuclei. The triple-alpha process happens in conditions of temperatures over 100 megakelvins and helium concentration that the rapid expansion and cooling of the early universe prohibited, and therefore no significant carbon was created during the Big Bang.

According to current physical cosmology theory, carbon is formed in the interiors of stars on the horizontal branch. When massive stars die as supernova, the carbon is scattered into space as dust. This dust becomes component material for the formation of the next-generation star systems with accreted planets. The Solar System is one such star system with an abundance of carbon, enabling the existence of life as we know it. It is the opinion of most scholars that all the carbon in the Solar System and the Milky Way comes from dying stars.

The CNO cycle is an additional hydrogen fusion mechanism that powers stars, wherein carbon operates as a catalyst.

Rotational transitions of various isotopic forms of carbon monoxide (for example, ^{12}CO, ^{13}CO, and ^{18}CO) are detectable in the submillimeter wavelength range, and are used in the study of newly forming stars in molecular clouds.

=== Carbon cycle ===
Diagram of the carbon cycle. The black numbers indicate how much carbon is stored in various reservoirs, in billions tonnes ("GtC" stands for gigatonnes of carbon; figures are c. 2004). The purple numbers indicate how much carbon moves between reservoirs each year. The sediments, as defined in this diagram, do not include the ≈70 million GtC of carbonate rock and kerogen.

Under terrestrial conditions, conversion of one element to another is very rare. Therefore, the amount of carbon on Earth is effectively constant. Thus, processes that use carbon must obtain it from somewhere and dispose of it somewhere else. The paths of carbon in the environment form the carbon cycle. For example, photosynthetic plants draw carbon dioxide from the atmosphere (or seawater) and build it into biomass, as in the Calvin cycle, a process of carbon fixation. Some of this biomass is eaten by animals, while some carbon is exhaled by animals as carbon dioxide. The carbon cycle is considerably more complicated than this short loop; for example, some carbon dioxide is dissolved in the oceans; if bacteria do not consume it, dead plant or animal matter may become petroleum or coal, which releases carbon when burned.

== Compounds ==
=== Organic compounds ===
Structural formula of methane, the simplest possible organic compound.

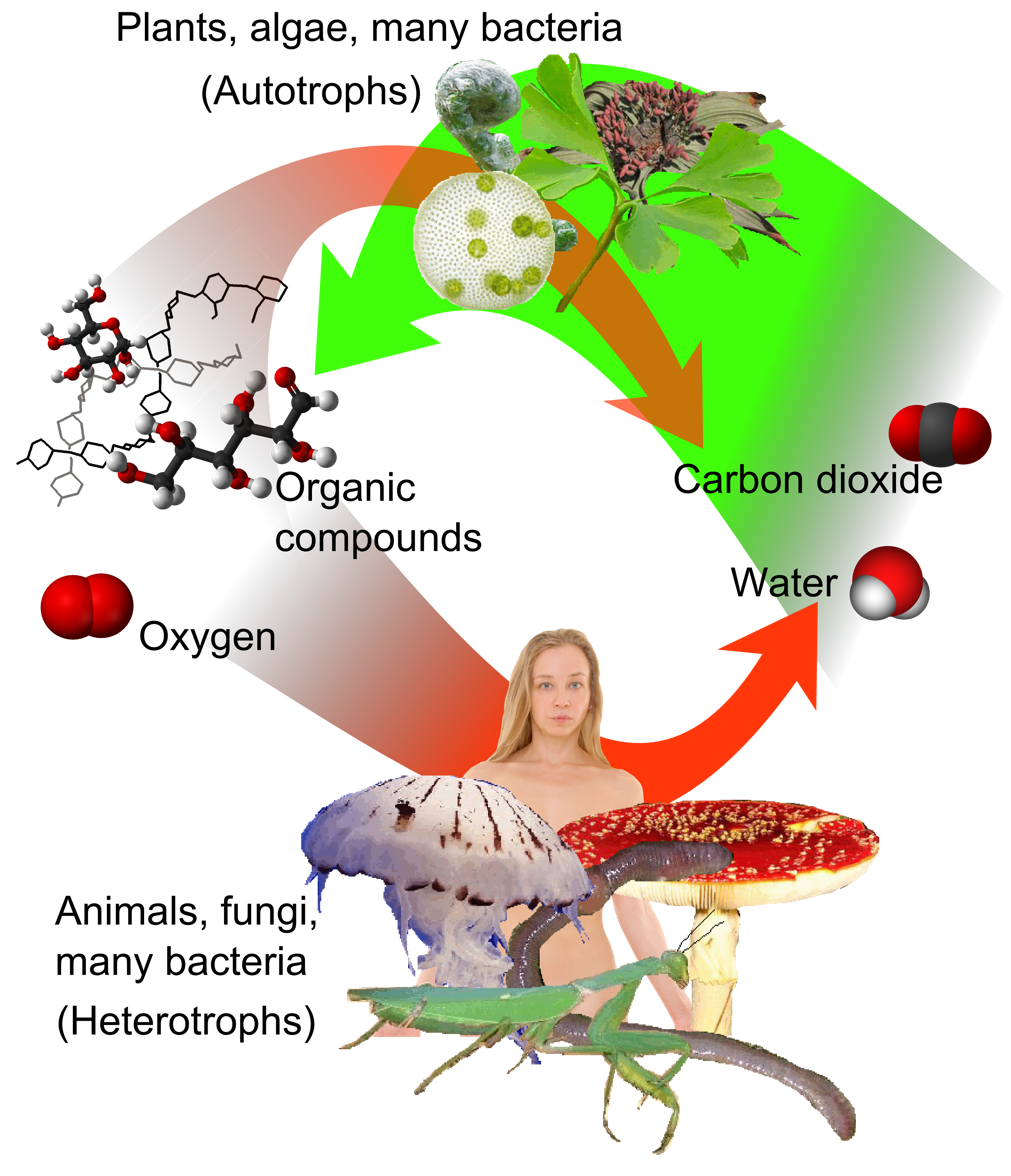
Correlation between the carbon cycle and formation of organic compounds. In plants, carbon dioxide formed by carbon fixation can join with water in photosynthesis (green) to form organic compounds, which can be used and further converted by both plants and animals.

Carbon can form very long chains of interconnecting carbon–carbon bonds, a property that is called catenation. Carbon-carbon bonds are strong and stable. Through catenation, carbon forms a countless number of compounds. A tally of unique compounds shows that more contain carbon than do not.

The simplest form of an organic molecule is the hydrocarbon—a large family of organic molecules that are composed of hydrogen atoms bonded to a chain of carbon atoms. A hydrocarbon backbone can be substituted by other atoms, known as heteroatoms. Common heteroatoms that appear in organic compounds include oxygen, nitrogen, sulfur, phosphorus, and the nonradioactive halogens, as well as the metals lithium and magnesium. Organic compounds containing bonds to metal are known as organometallic compounds (see below). Certain groupings of atoms, often including heteroatoms, recur in large numbers of organic compounds. These collections, known as functional groups, confer common reactivity patterns and allow for the systematic study and categorization of organic compounds. Chain length, shape and functional groups all affect the properties of organic molecules.

In most stable compounds of carbon (and nearly all stable organic compounds), carbon obeys the octet rule and is tetravalent, meaning that a carbon atom forms a total of four covalent bonds (which may include double and triple bonds). Exceptions include a small number of stabilized carbocations (three bonds, positive charge), radicals (three bonds, neutral), carbanions (three bonds, negative charge) and carbenes (two bonds, neutral), although these species are much more likely to be encountered as unstable, reactive intermediates.

Carbon occurs in all known organic life and is the basis of organic chemistry. When united with hydrogen, it forms various hydrocarbons that are important to industry as refrigerants, lubricants, solvents, as chemical feedstock for the manufacture of plastics and petrochemicals, and as fossil fuels.

When combined with oxygen and hydrogen, carbon can form many groups of important biological compounds including sugars, lignans, chitins, alcohols, fats, aromatic esters, carotenoids and terpenes. With nitrogen, it forms alkaloids, and with the addition of sulfur also it forms antibiotics, amino acids, and rubber products. With the addition of phosphorus to these other elements, it forms DNA and RNA, the chemical-code carriers of life, and adenosine triphosphate (ATP), the most important energy-transfer molecule in all living cells. Norman Horowitz, head of the Mariner and Viking missions to Mars (1965–1976), considered that the unique characteristics of carbon made it unlikely that any other element could replace carbon, even on another planet, to generate the biochemistry necessary for life.

=== Inorganic compounds ===
Commonly carbon-containing compounds which are associated with minerals or which do not contain bonds to the other carbon atoms, halogens, or hydrogen, are treated separately from classical organic compounds; the definition is not rigid, and the classification of some compounds can vary from author to author (see reference articles above). Among these are the simple oxides of carbon. The most prominent oxide is carbon dioxide (CO_{2}). This was once the principal constituent of the paleoatmosphere, but is a minor component of the Earth's atmosphere today. Dissolved in water, it forms carbonic acid (H_{2}CO_{3}), but as most compounds with multiple single-bonded oxygens on a single carbon it is unstable. Through this intermediate, though, resonance-stabilized carbonate ions are produced. Some important minerals are carbonates, notably calcite. Carbon disulfide (CS_{2}) is similar.

The other common oxide is carbon monoxide (CO). It is formed by incomplete combustion, and is a colorless, odorless gas. The molecules each contain a triple bond and are fairly polar, resulting in a tendency to bind permanently to hemoglobin molecules, displacing oxygen, which has a lower binding affinity. Cyanide (CN^{−}) has a similar structure, but behaves much like a halide ion (pseudohalogen). For example, it can form the nitride cyanogen molecule ((CN)_{2}), similar to diatomic halides. Likewise, the heavier analog of cyanide, cyaphide (CP^{−}), is also considered inorganic, though most simple derivatives are highly unstable. Other uncommon oxides are carbon suboxide (C_{3}O_{2}), the unstable dicarbon monoxide (C_{2}O), carbon trioxide (CO_{3}), cyclopentanepentone (C_{5}O_{5}), cyclohexanehexone (C_{6}O_{6}), and mellitic anhydride (C_{12}O_{9}). However, mellitic anhydride is the triple acyl anhydride of mellitic acid; moreover, it contains a benzene ring. Thus, many chemists consider it to be organic.

With reactive metals, such as tungsten, carbon forms either carbides (C^{4−}) or acetylides (C^{2−}_{2}) to form alloys with high melting points. These anions are also associated with methane and acetylene, both very weak acids. With an electronegativity of 2.5, carbon prefers to form covalent bonds. A few carbides are covalent lattices, like carborundum (SiC), which resembles diamond. Nevertheless, even the most polar and salt-like of carbides are not completely ionic compounds.

=== Organometallic compounds ===
Organometallic compounds by definition contain at least one carbon-metal covalent bond. A wide range of such compounds exist; major classes include simple alkyl-metal compounds (for example, tetraethyllead), η^{2}-alkene compounds (for example, Zeise's salt), and η^{3}-allyl compounds (for example, allylpalladium chloride dimer); metallocenes containing cyclopentadienyl ligands (for example, ferrocene); and transition metal carbene complexes. Many metal carbonyls and metal cyanides exist (for example, tetracarbonylnickel and potassium ferricyanide); some workers consider metal carbonyl and cyanide complexes without other carbon ligands to be purely inorganic, and not organometallic. However, most organometallic chemists consider metal complexes with any carbon ligand, even 'inorganic carbon' (e.g., carbonyls, cyanides, and certain types of carbides and acetylides) to be organometallic in nature. Metal complexes containing organic ligands without a carbon-metal covalent bond (e.g., metal carboxylates) are termed metalorganic compounds.

While carbon is understood to strongly prefer formation of four covalent bonds, other exotic bonding schemes are also known. Carboranes are highly stable dodecahedral derivatives of the [B_{12}H_{12}]^{2-} unit, with one BH replaced with a CH^{+}. Thus, the carbon is bonded to five boron atoms and one hydrogen atom. The cation [(Ph_{3}PAu)_{6}C]^{2+} contains an octahedral carbon bound to six phosphine-gold fragments. This phenomenon has been attributed to the aurophilicity of the gold ligands, which provide additional stabilization of an otherwise labile species. In nature, the iron-molybdenum cofactor (FeMoco) responsible for microbial nitrogen fixation likewise has an octahedral carbon center (formally a carbide, C(-IV)) bonded to six iron atoms. In 2016, it was confirmed that, in line with earlier theoretical predictions, the hexamethylbenzene dication contains a carbon atom with six bonds. More specifically, the dication could be described structurally by the formulation [MeC(η^{5}-C_{5}Me_{5})]^{2+}, making it an "organic metallocene" in which a MeC^{3+} fragment is bonded to a η^{5}-C_{5}Me_{5}^{−} fragment through all five of the carbons of the ring.

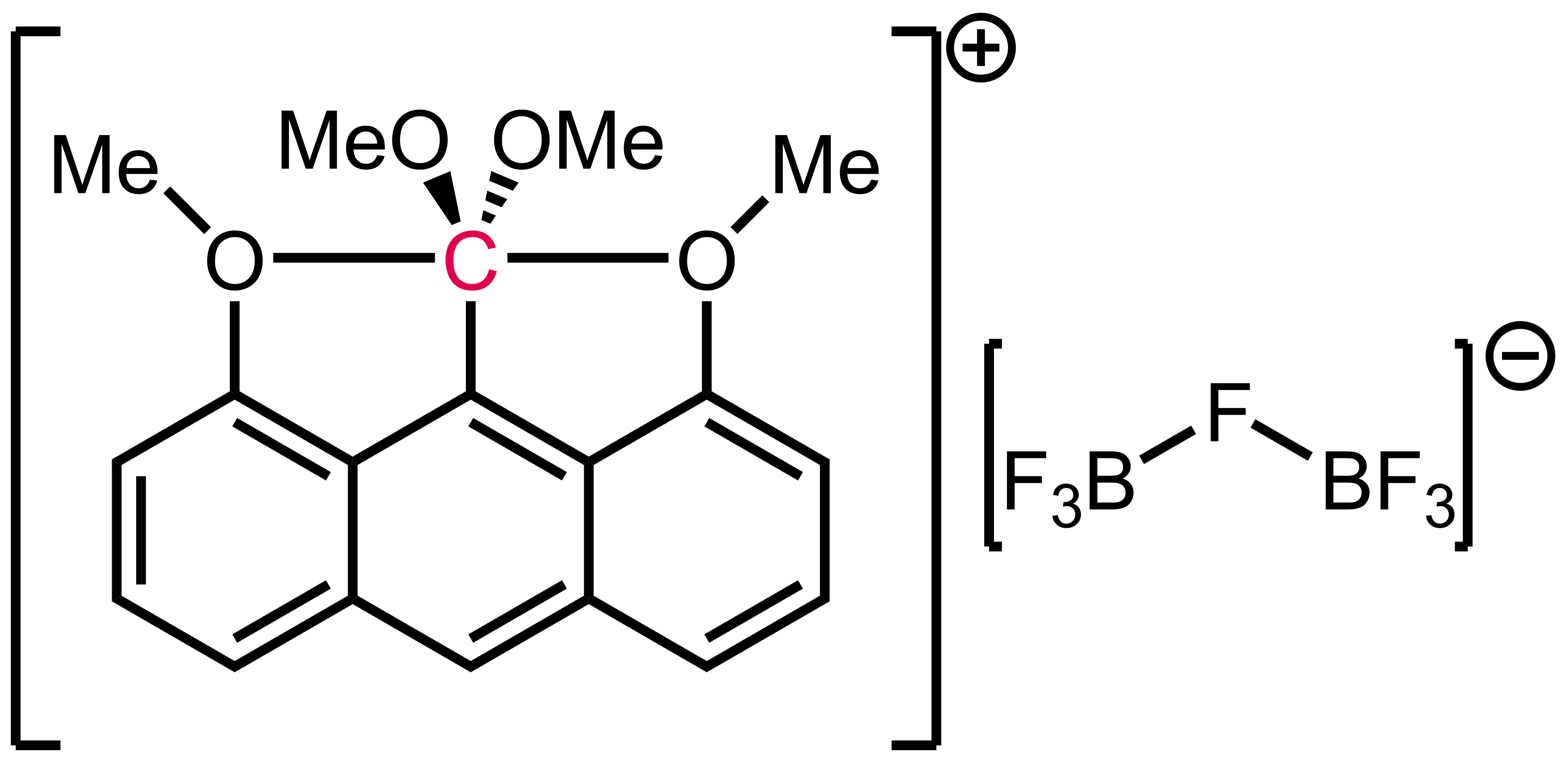
This anthracene derivative contains a carbon atom with 5 formal electron pairs around it.

In the cases above, each of the bonds to carbon contain less than two formal electron pairs. Thus, the formal electron count of these species does not exceed an octet. This makes them hypercoordinate but not hypervalent. Even in cases of alleged 10-C-5 species (that is, a carbon with five ligands and a formal electron count of ten), as reported by Akiba and co-workers, electronic structure calculations conclude that the electron population around carbon is still less than eight, as is true for other compounds featuring four-electron three-center bonding.

== History and etymology ==
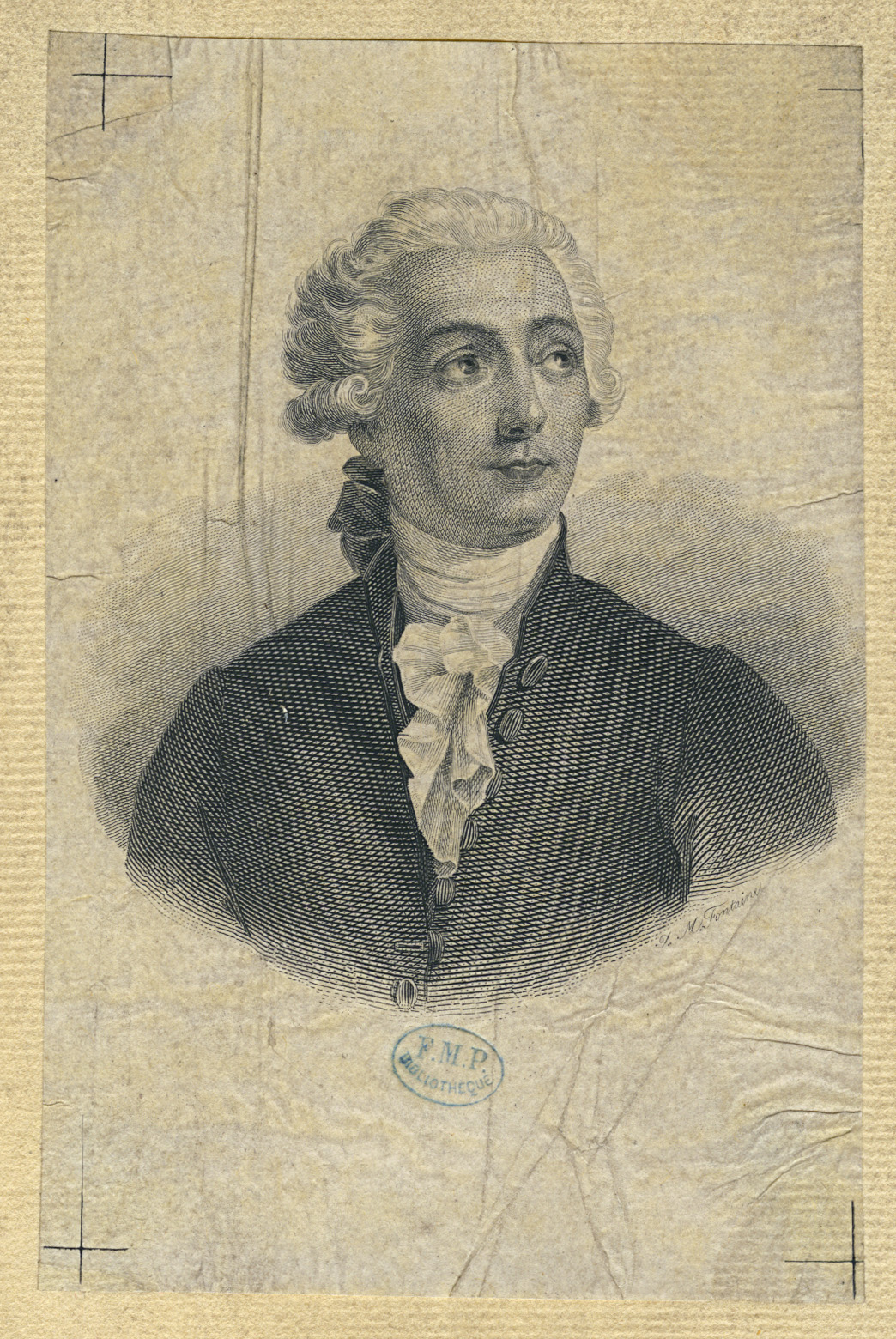
Antoine Lavoisier in his youth

The English name carbon comes from the Latin carbo for coal and charcoal, whence also comes the French charbon, meaning charcoal. In German, Dutch and Danish, the names for carbon are Kohlenstoff, koolstof, and kulstof respectively, all literally meaning coal-substance.

Carbon was discovered in prehistory and was known in the forms of soot and charcoal to the earliest human civilizations. Diamonds were known probably as early as 2500 BCE in China, while carbon in the form of charcoal was made by the same chemistry as it is today, by heating wood in a pyramid covered with clay to exclude air.

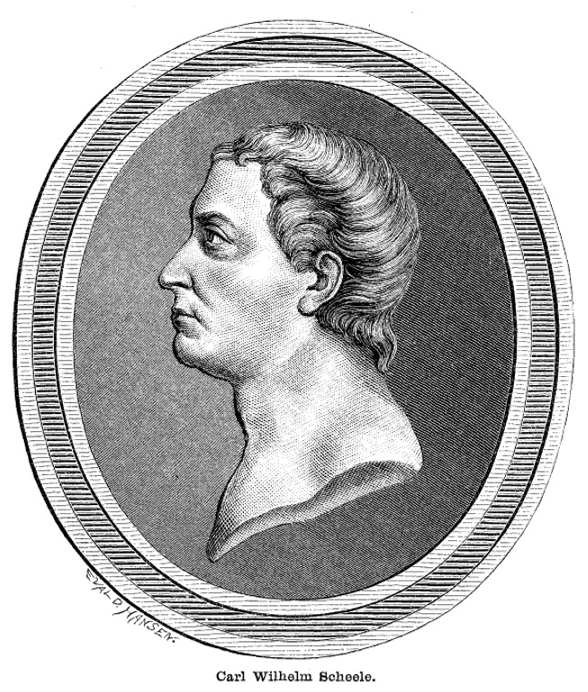
Carl Wilhelm Scheele

In 1722, René Antoine Ferchault de Réaumur demonstrated that iron was transformed into steel through the absorption of some substance, now known to be carbon. In 1772, Antoine Lavoisier showed that diamonds are a form of carbon; when he burned samples of charcoal and diamond and found that neither produced any water and that both released the same amount of carbon dioxide per gram. In 1779, Carl Wilhelm Scheele showed that graphite, which had been thought of as a form of lead, was instead identical with charcoal but with a small admixture of iron, and that it gave "aerial acid" (his name for carbon dioxide) when oxidized with nitric acid. In 1786, the French scientists Claude Louis Berthollet, Gaspard Monge and C. A. Vandermonde confirmed that graphite was mostly carbon by oxidizing it in oxygen in much the same way Lavoisier had done with diamond. Some iron again was left, which the French scientists thought was necessary to the graphite structure. In their publication they proposed the name carbone (Latin carbonum) for the element in graphite which was given off as a gas upon burning graphite. Antoine Lavoisier then listed carbon as an element in his 1789 textbook.

A new allotrope of carbon, fullerene, that was discovered in 1985 includes nanostructured forms such as buckyballs and nanotubes. Their discoverers – Robert Curl, Harold Kroto, and Richard Smalley – received the Nobel Prize in Chemistry in 1996. The resulting renewed interest in new forms led to the discovery of further exotic allotropes, including glassy carbon, and the realization that "amorphous carbon" is not strictly amorphous.

== Production ==
=== Graphite ===
Commercially viable natural deposits of graphite occur in many parts of the world, but the most important sources economically are in China, India, Brazil, and North Korea. Graphite deposits are of metamorphic origin, found in association with quartz, mica, and feldspars in schists, gneisses, and metamorphosed sandstones and limestone as lenses or veins, sometimes of a metre or more in thickness. Deposits of graphite in Borrowdale, Cumberland, England were at first of sufficient size and purity that, until the 19th century, pencils were made by sawing blocks of natural graphite into strips before encasing the strips in wood. Today, smaller deposits of graphite are obtained by crushing the parent rock and floating the lighter graphite out on water.

There are three types of natural graphite—amorphous, flake or crystalline flake, and vein or lump. Amorphous graphite is the lowest quality and most abundant. Contrary to science, in industry "amorphous" refers to very small crystal size rather than complete lack of crystal structure. Amorphous is used for lower value graphite products and is the lowest priced graphite. Large amorphous graphite deposits are found in China, Europe, Mexico and the United States. Flake graphite is less common and of higher quality than amorphous; it occurs as separate plates that crystallized in metamorphic rock. Flake graphite can be four times the price of amorphous. Good quality flakes can be processed into expandable graphite for many uses, such as flame retardants. The foremost deposits are found in Austria, Brazil, Canada, China, Germany and Madagascar. Vein or lump graphite is the rarest, most valuable, and highest quality type of natural graphite. It occurs in veins along intrusive contacts in solid lumps, and it is only commercially mined in Sri Lanka.

According to the USGS, world production of natural graphite was 1.1 million tonnes in 2010, to which China contributed 800,000 t, India 130,000 t, Brazil 76,000 t, North Korea 30,000 t and Canada 25,000 t. No natural graphite was reported mined in the United States, but 118,000 t of synthetic graphite with an estimated value of $998 million was produced in 2009.

=== Diamond ===
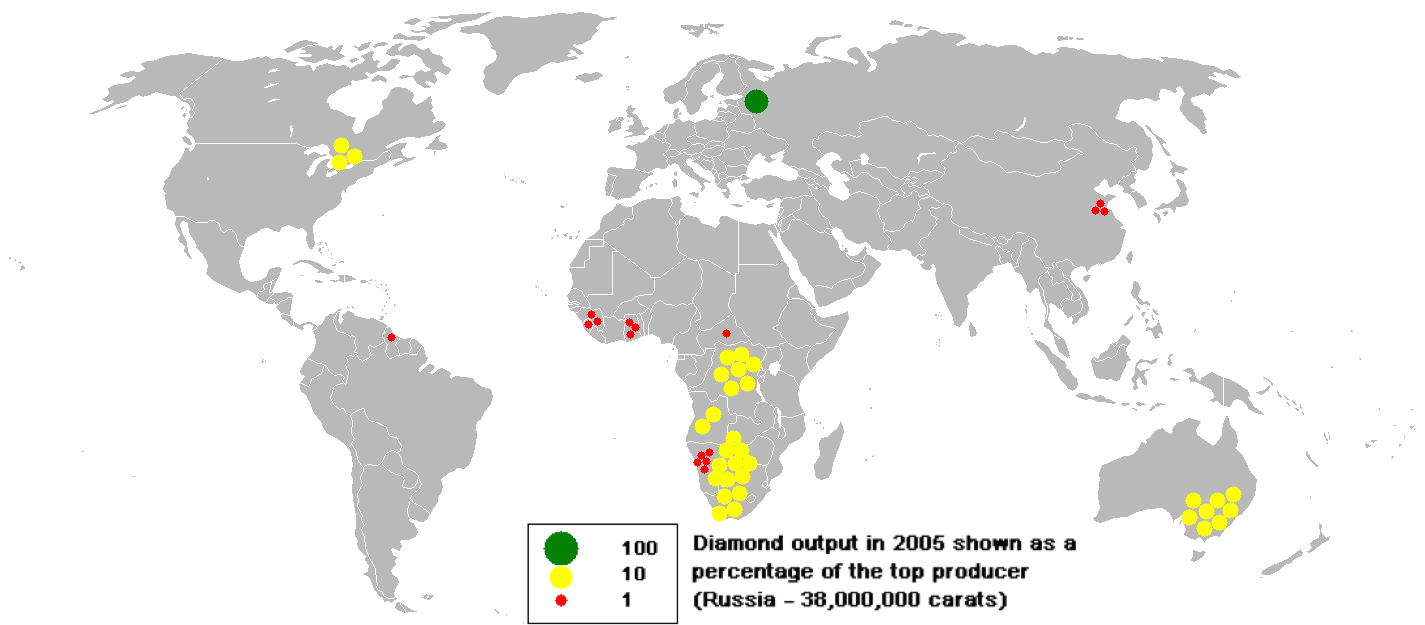
Diamond output in 2005

The diamond supply chain is controlled by a limited number of powerful businesses, and is also highly concentrated in a small number of locations around the world (see figure).

Only a very small fraction of the diamond ore consists of actual diamonds. The ore is crushed, during which care has to be taken in order to prevent larger diamonds from being destroyed in this process and subsequently the particles are sorted by density. Today, diamonds are located in the diamond-rich density fraction with the help of X-ray fluorescence, after which the final sorting steps are done by hand. Before the use of X-rays became commonplace, the separation was done with grease belts; diamonds have a stronger tendency to stick to grease than the other minerals in the ore.

Historically diamonds were known to be found only in alluvial deposits in southern India. India led the world in diamond production from the time of their discovery in approximately the 9th century BC to the mid-18th century AD, but the commercial potential of these sources had been exhausted by the late 18th century and at that time India was eclipsed by Brazil where the first non-Indian diamonds were found in 1725.

Diamond production of primary deposits (kimberlites and lamproites) only started in the 1870s after the discovery of the diamond fields in South Africa. Production has increased over time and an accumulated total of over 4.5 billion carats have been mined since that date. Most commercially viable diamond deposits were in Russia, Botswana, Australia and the Democratic Republic of Congo. By 2005, Russia produced almost one-fifth of the global diamond output (mostly in Yakutia territory; for example, Mir pipe and Udachnaya pipe) but the Argyle mine in Australia became the single largest source, producing 14 million carats in 2018. New finds, the Canadian mines at Diavik and Ekati, are expected to become even more valuable owing to their production of gem quality stones.

In the United States, diamonds have been found in Arkansas, Colorado, and Montana. In 2004, a startling discovery of a microscopic diamond in the United States led to the January 2008 bulk-sampling of kimberlite pipes in a remote part of Montana.

While natural diamonds form over time deep within the Earth, synthetic diamonds are created in laboratories through a variety of methods. The original method uses high pressure and high temperature (HPHT) and is still widely used because of its relatively low cost. The process involves large presses that can weigh hundreds of tons to produce a pressure of 5 GPa (730,000 psi) at 1,500 °C (2,730 °F). The second method, using chemical vapor deposition (CVD), creates a carbon plasma over a substrate onto which the carbon atoms deposit to form diamond. Other methods include explosive formation (forming detonation nanodiamonds) and sonication of graphite solutions.

== Applications ==
Applications of carbon
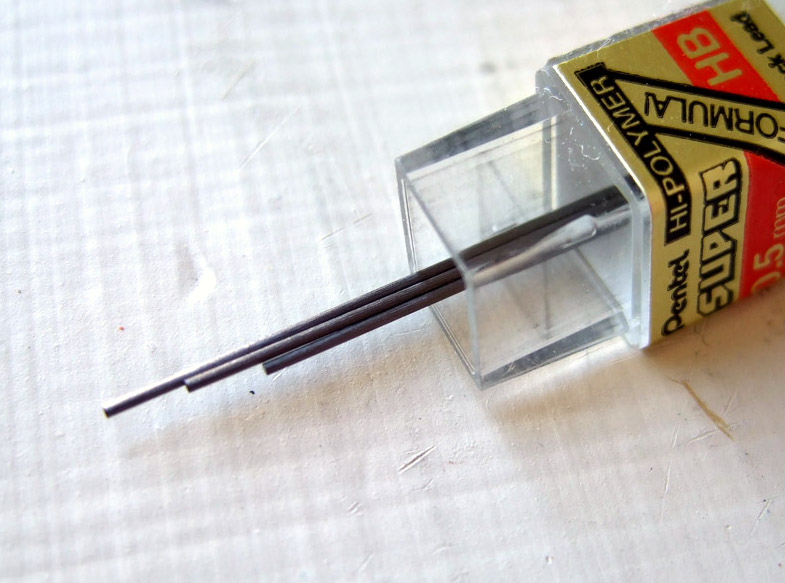
Pencil leads for mechanical pencils are made of graphite

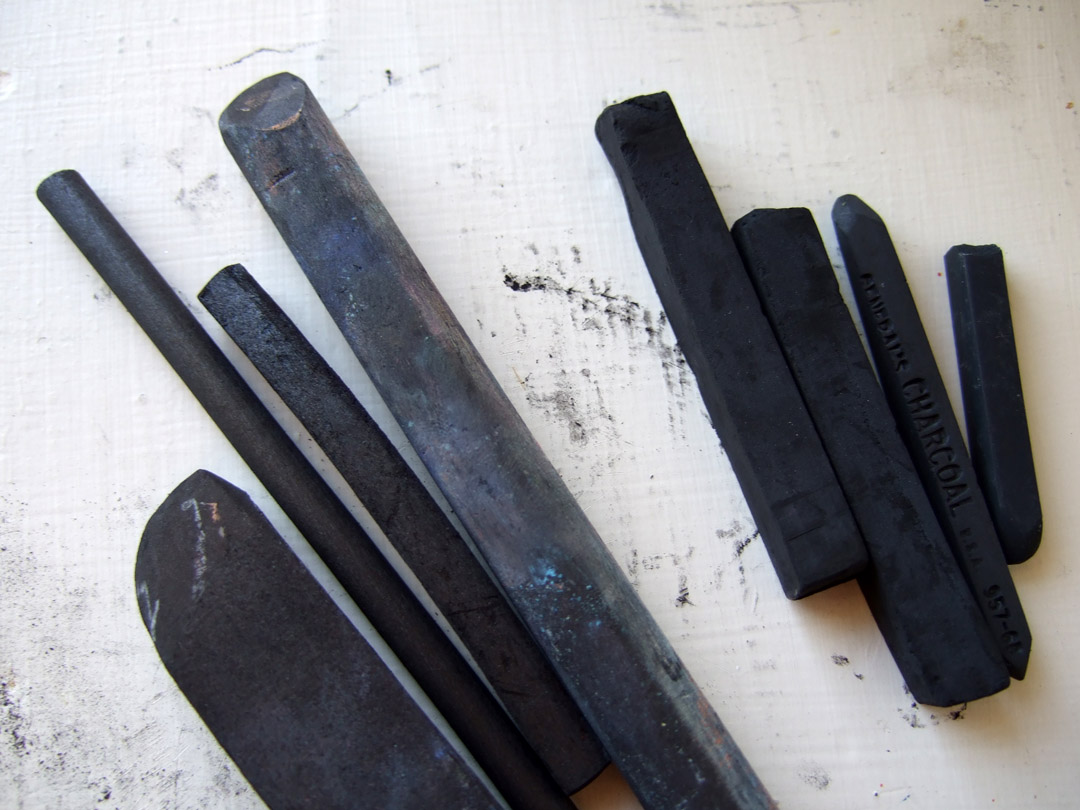
Sticks of vine and compressed charcoal

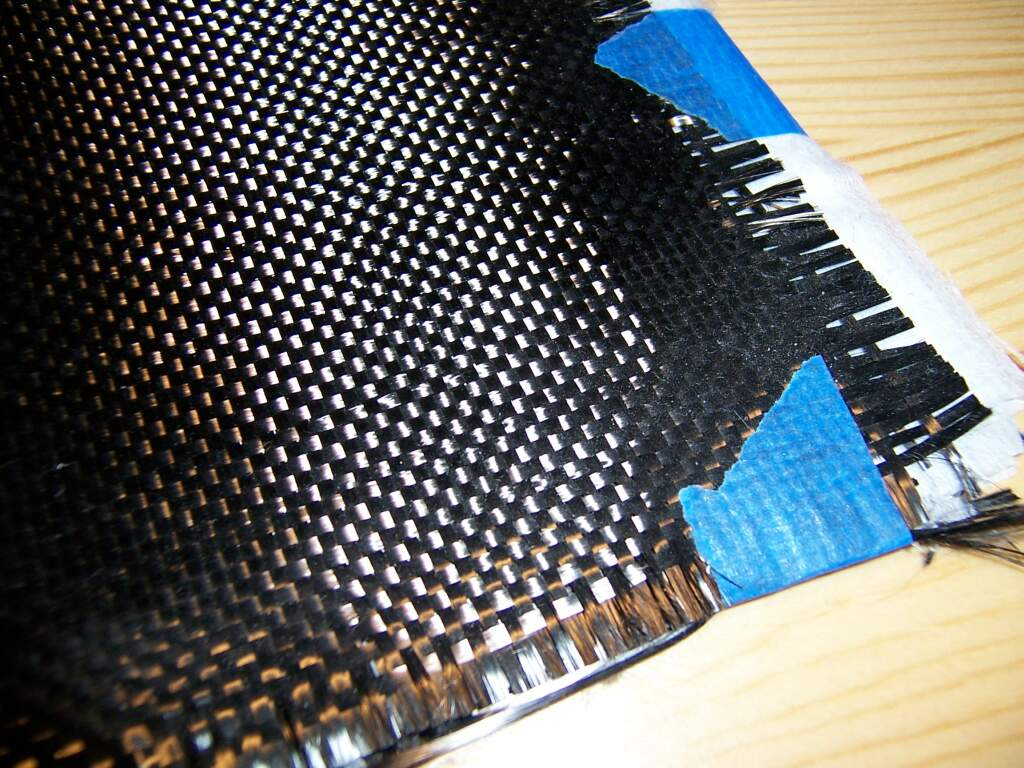
A cloth of woven carbon fibres

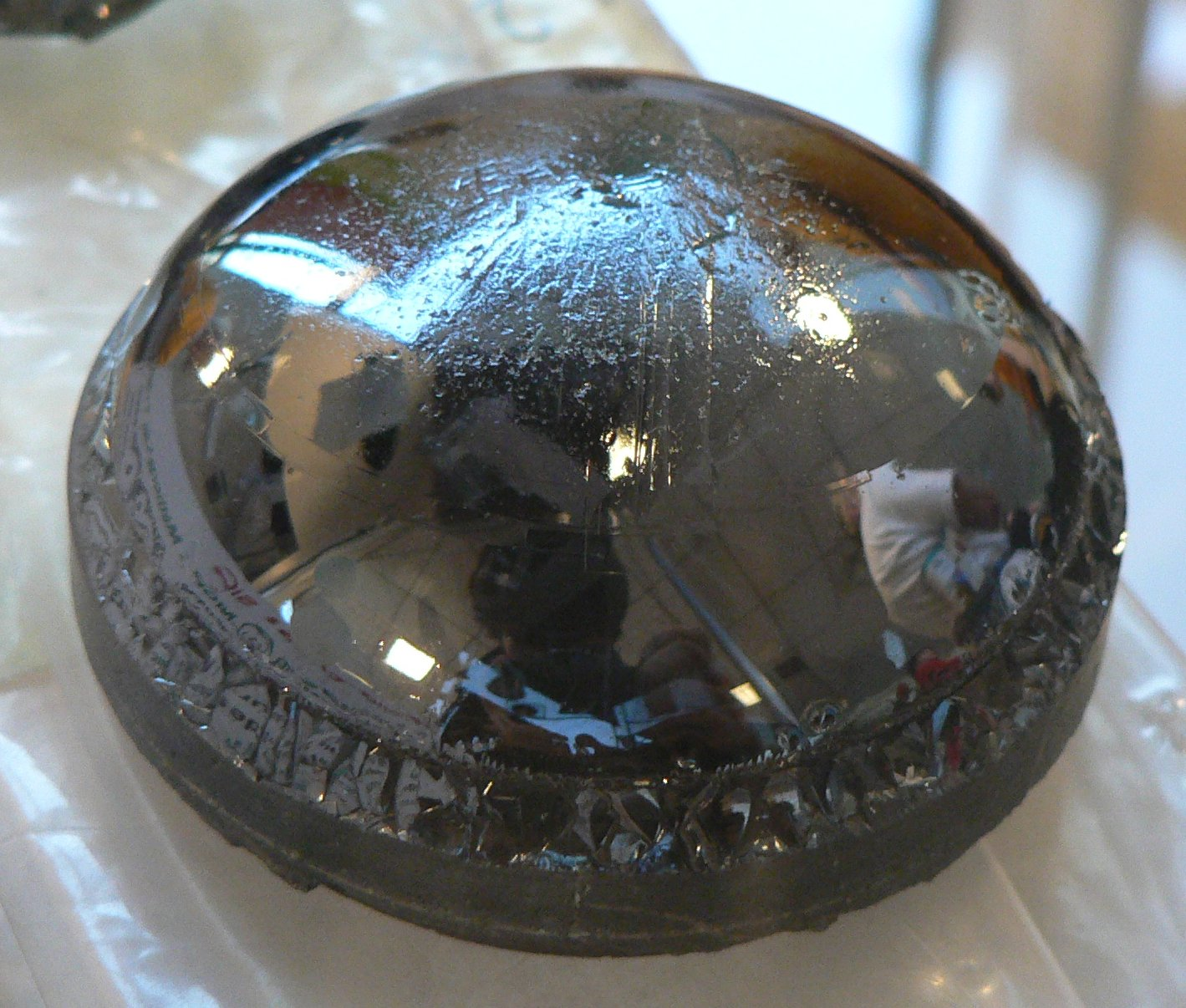
Silicon carbide single crystal

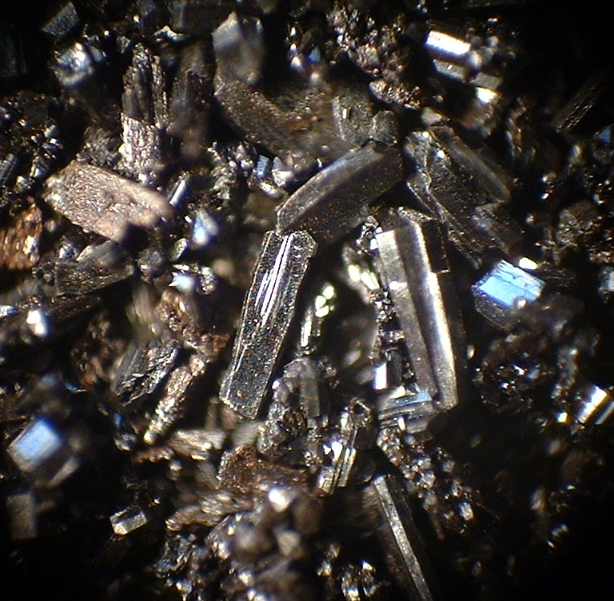
The C_{60} fullerene in crystalline form

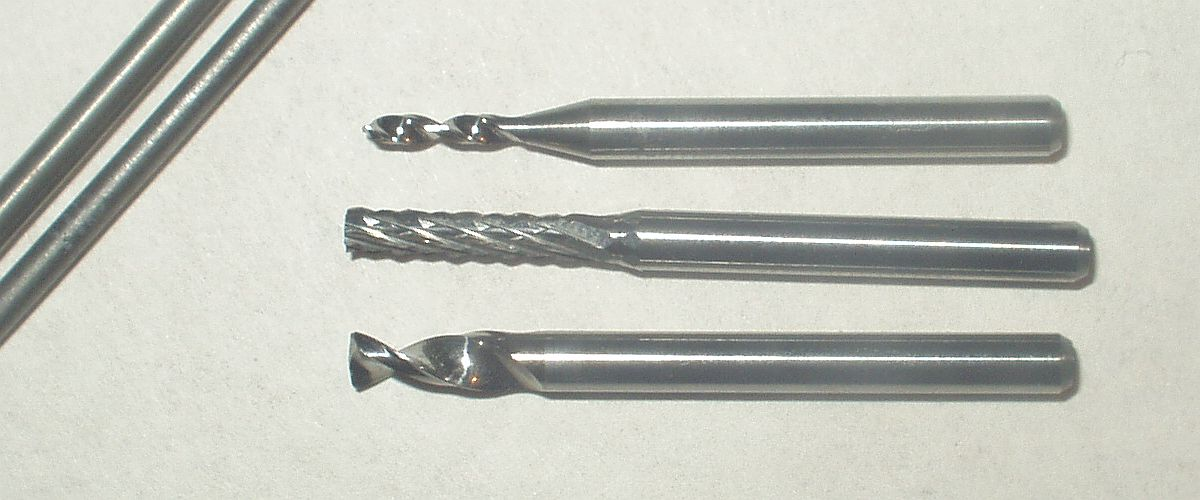
Tungsten carbide endmills

Carbon is essential to all known living systems, and without it life as we know it could not exist (see alternative biochemistry). The major economic use of carbon other than food and wood is in the form of hydrocarbons, most notably the greenhouse gas and fossil fuel methane gas and crude oil (petroleum). Crude oil is distilled in refineries by the petrochemical industry to produce gasoline, kerosene, and other products. Cellulose is a natural, carbon-containing polymer produced by plants in the form of wood, cotton, linen, and hemp. Cellulose is used primarily for maintaining structure in plants. Commercially valuable carbon polymers of animal origin include wool, cashmere, and silk. Plastics are made from synthetic carbon polymers, often with oxygen and nitrogen atoms included at regular intervals in the main polymer chain. The raw materials for many of these synthetic substances come from crude oil and coal.

The uses of carbon and its compounds are extremely varied. It can form alloys with iron, of which the most common is carbon steel. Graphite is combined with clays to form the 'lead' used in pencils used for writing and drawing. It is also used as a lubricant and a pigment, as a moulding material in glass manufacture, in electrodes for dry batteries and in electroplating and electroforming, in brushes for electric motors, and as a neutron moderator in nuclear reactors.

Charcoal is used as a drawing material in artwork, barbecue grilling, iron smelting, and in many other applications. Wood, coal and oil are used as fuel for production of energy and heating. Gem quality diamond is used in jewelry, and industrial diamonds are used in drilling, cutting and polishing tools for machining metals and stone. Carbon fiber, which is produced by pyrolyzing synthetic polyester fibers, is used to reinforce plastics, creating advanced, lightweight composite materials.

Carbon fiber is made by pyrolysis of extruded and stretched filaments of polyacrylonitrile (PAN) and other organic substances. The crystallographic structure and mechanical properties of the fiber depend on the type of starting material, and on the subsequent processing. Carbon fibers made from PAN have structure resembling narrow filaments of graphite, but thermal processing may re-order the structure into a continuous rolled sheet. The result is fibers with higher specific tensile strength than steel.

Carbon black is used as the black pigment in printing ink, artist's oil paint, and water colours, carbon paper, automotive finishes, India ink and laser printer toner. Carbon black is also used as a filler in rubber products such as tyres and in plastic compounds. Activated charcoal is used as an absorbent and adsorbent in filter material in applications as diverse as gas masks, water purification, and kitchen extractor hoods, and in medicine to absorb toxins, poisons, or gases from the digestive system. Carbon is used in chemical reduction at high temperatures. Coke is used to reduce iron ore into iron (smelting). Case hardening of steel is achieved by heating finished steel components in carbon powder. Carbides of silicon, tungsten, boron, and titanium are among the hardest known materials, and are used as abrasives in cutting and grinding tools. Carbon compounds make up most of the materials used in clothing, such as natural and synthetic textiles and leather, and almost all of the interior surfaces in the built environment other than glass, stone, drywall, and metal.

=== Diamonds ===
The diamond industry falls into two categories: one dealing with gem-grade diamonds and the other, with industrial-grade diamonds. While a large trade in both types of diamonds exists, the two markets function dramatically differently. Unlike precious metals such as gold or platinum, gem diamonds do not trade as a commodity. There is a substantial mark-up in the sale of diamonds, and there is not a very active market for resale of diamonds.

Industrial diamonds are valued mostly for their hardness and heat conductivity, with the gemological qualities of clarity and color being mostly irrelevant. About 80% of mined diamonds (equal to about 100 million carats or 20 tonnes annually) are unsuitable for use as gemstones and relegated for industrial use (known as bort). Synthetic diamonds, invented in the 1950s, found almost immediate industrial applications; 3 billion carats (600 tonnes) of synthetic diamond is produced annually.

The dominant industrial use of diamond is in cutting, drilling, grinding, and polishing. Most of these applications do not require large diamonds; in fact, most diamonds of gem-quality except for their small size can be used industrially. Diamonds are embedded in drill tips or saw blades, or ground into a powder for use in grinding and polishing applications. Specialized applications include use in laboratories as containment for high-pressure experiments (see diamond anvil cell), high-performance bearings, and limited use in specialized windows. With the continuing advances in the production of synthetic diamonds, new applications are becoming feasible. Garnering much excitement is the possible use of diamond as a semiconductor suitable for microchips, and because of its exceptional heat conductance property, as a heat sink in electronics.

== Precautions ==
Graphite
Hazards
- GHS labelling
Hazard statements	H315, H335
NFPA 704 (fire diamond)	2 1 0

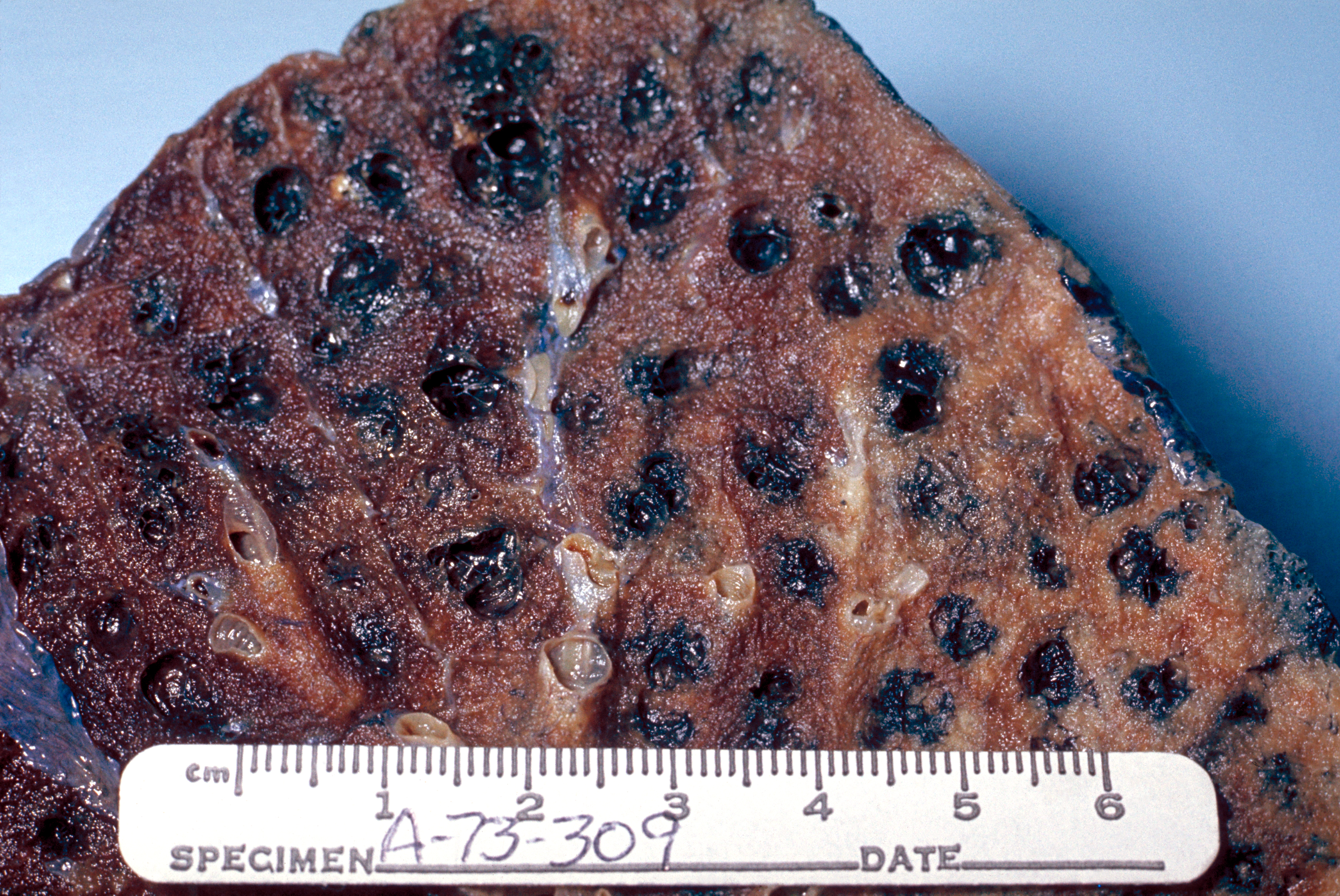
Gross pathology of lung showing centrilobular emphysema characteristic of smoking. Closeup of fixed, cut surface shows multiple cavities lined by heavy black carbon deposits.

Pure carbon has extremely low toxicity to humans and can be handled safely in the form of graphite or charcoal. It is resistant to dissolution or chemical attack, even in the acidic contents of the digestive tract. Consequently, once it enters into the body's tissues it is likely to remain there indefinitely. Carbon black was probably one of the first pigments to be used for tattooing, and Ötzi the Iceman was found to have carbon tattoos that survived during his life and for 5200 years after his death. Inhalation of coal dust or soot (carbon black) in large quantities can be dangerous, irritating lung tissues and causing the congestive lung disease, coalworker's pneumoconiosis. Diamond dust used as an abrasive can be harmful if ingested or inhaled. Microparticles of carbon are produced in diesel engine exhaust fumes, and may accumulate in the lungs. However, in these examples, the harm may result from contaminants (e.g., organic chemicals, heavy metals) rather than from the carbon itself.

Carbon may burn vigorously and brightly in the presence of air at high temperatures. Large accumulations of coal, which have remained inert for hundreds of millions of years in the absence of oxygen, may spontaneously combust when exposed to air in coal mine waste tips, ship cargo holds and coal bunkers, and storage dumps.

In nuclear applications where graphite is used as a neutron moderator, accumulation of Wigner energy followed by a sudden, spontaneous release may occur. Annealing to at least 250 °C can release the energy safely, although in the Windscale fire the procedure went wrong, causing other reactor materials to combust.

The great variety of carbon compounds include such lethal poisons as tetrodotoxin, the lectin ricin from seeds of the castor oil plant Ricinus communis, cyanide (CN^{−}), and carbon monoxide; and such essentials to life as glucose and protein.

== See also ==
- Carbon chauvinism
- Carbon detonation
- Carbon footprint
- Carbon star
- Carbon planet
- Low-carbon economy
- Timeline of carbon nanotubes

== Bibliography ==
- Greenwood, Norman N.; Earnshaw, Alan (1997). Chemistry of the Elements (2nd ed.). Butterworth-Heinemann. doi:10.1016/C2009-0-30414-6. ISBN 978-0-08-037941-8.
- Housecroft, C. E.; Sharpe, A. G. (2018). Inorganic Chemistry (5th ed.). Prentice Hall. ISBN 978-1-292-13414-7.
- Mannion, A. M. (12 January 2006). Carbon and Its Domestication. Springer. pp. 1–319. ISBN 978-1-4020-3956-0.
