= AA'-graphite =

Allotrope of carbon

AA'-graphite is an allotrope of carbon similar to graphite, but where the layers are positioned differently to each other as compared to the order in graphite.

AA' stacking of graphene planes is another crystalline form of graphite (orthorhombic, Fig. 1) which is metastable for Bernal AB graphite (hexagonal) (Fig. 2) and reveals a nanocrystalline feature. Dr. Jae-Kap Lee discovered the new crystalline form of graphite in 2008 when he grew graphite onto diamond. He realized that graphene layers comprising graphite grew on diamond (111) plane with stacked in the sequence of AA', due to the crystallographic feature of diamond. The non-Bernal AA' allotrope of graphite is synthesized by the thermal- and plasma-treatment of graphene nanopowders at ~1,500 °C. The formation of AA' bilayer graphene nuclei facilitates the preferred texture growth and results in single-crystal AA' graphite in the form of nanoribbons (1D) or microplates (2D) of a few nm in thickness. Kinetically controlled AA' graphite exhibits unique nano- and single-crystalline feature and shows quasi-linear behavior near the K-point of the electronic band structure resulting in anomalous optical and acoustic phonon behavior (Fig. 3). Lee et al. also revealed that multi-wall carbon nanotubes (MWNT) is a type of AA' graphite. That is, MWNTs are composed of AA' stacked graphene helices rather than concentric tubes (to be linked later).
