= Hackl =

Hackl is a German surname. Notable people with the surname include:

- Anton Hackl (1915–1984), German Luftwaffe pilot
- Zeno Otton Hackl (1912–1992), Bosnian and Croatian actor
- Christine Stix-Hackl (1957–2018), Austrian jurist
- David Hackl, film director and production designer
- Erich Hackl (born 1954), Austrian novelist
- Georg Hackl (born 1966), German luger
- Karlheinz Hackl (1949–2014), Austrian actor
- Raphael Hackl (born 1987), German rugby player

== See also ==
- Haeckel (disambiguation)
- Hackel
