= Zeno Otton Hackl =

Zeno Hackl
- Born: Zeno Otton Hackl; 16 July 1912; Dubrovnik, Kingdom of Dalmatia, Austria-Hungary
- Died: 14 May 1992 (aged 79); Mostar, Bosnia and Herzegovina
- Other name: Otton
- Occupations: Actor and director
- Years active: 1936–1982
- Spouse: Vera Hackl

Zeno Hackl (16 July 1912 in Dubrovnik – 14 May 1992 in Mostar) was a Yugoslav actor.

== Biography ==
After finishing elementary and secondary school in Mostar he moved to Zagreb to study acting in what was then called a "State Acting School" (1931–34). Later its name was changed to the "Academy of Performing Arts". In 1934 he went to Vienna for further education in theatre and acting from 1934 to 1936. He returned to Mostar in 1936 and became an active member of "Hrvoje" theatre where he performed as an actor and director (1936–49).

Zeno Hackl was one of the founders of the "National Theater of Mostar", which was established in 1949.

His varied career included theatre, television, film, as well as directing (1936–82).

In 2014, Zeno Hackl was honoured posthumously and presented with a Plaque for his life's work, commitment, art and contribution to theatre art as part of the celebration of the 65th anniversary of the Mostar National Theater.

== Filmography ==
- Crni Biseri (1958)
- Radopolje (1963)
- Horoskop (1969)
