= Haeckelites =

Family of hypothetical carbon allotropes

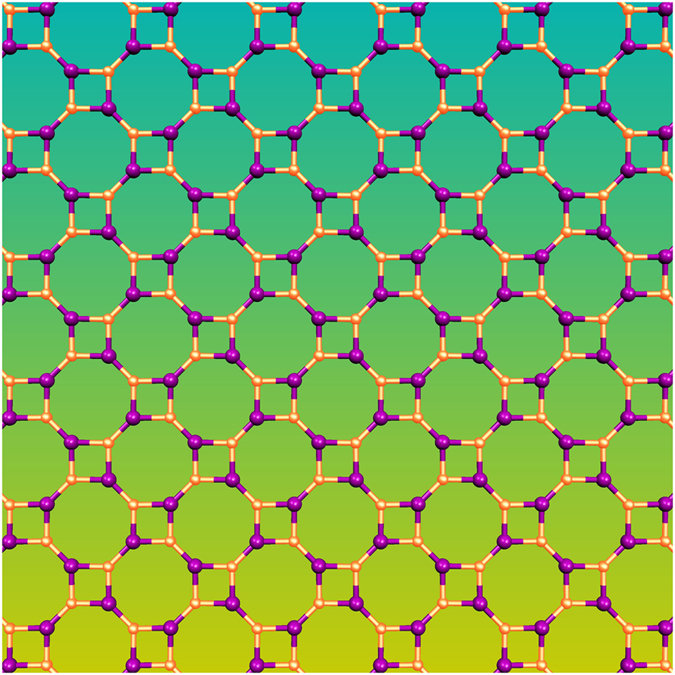
Haeckelite 8–4 structure containing square and octagonal rings

Haeckelites are members of a proposed family of hypothetical carbon allotropes. The carbon atoms would be arranged in a trivalently coordinated structure generated by a periodic arrangement of pentagonal, hexagonal and heptagonal carbon rings. They have not yet been synthesised in the laboratory, but have been the subject of a considerable amount of theoretical work and numerical simulation. They were first proposed by Humberto and Mauricio Terrones and their colleagues in 2000.

== Name ==
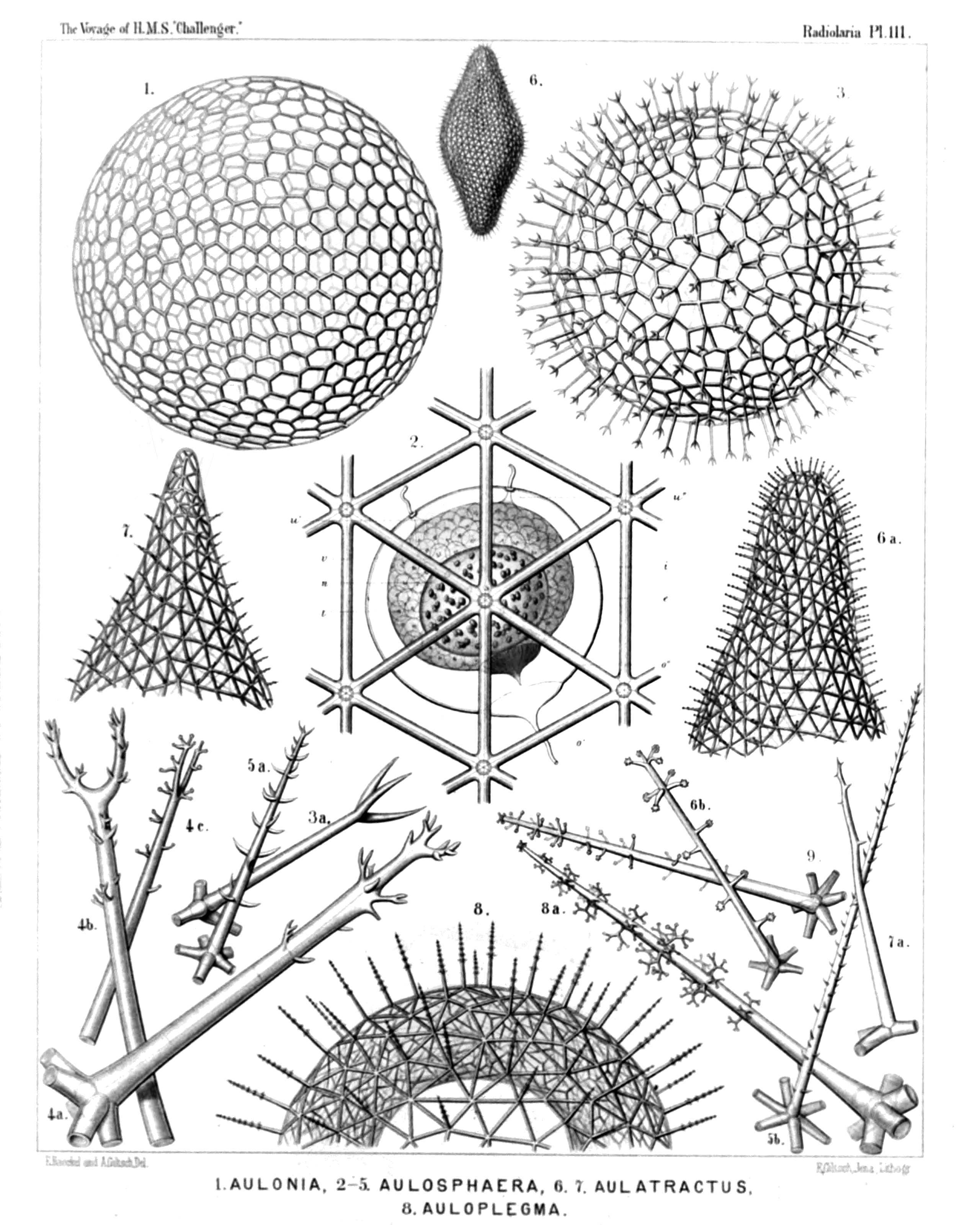
Artful illustrations of protists by Ernst Haeckel inspired the name, like this plate depicting a fullerene-like Aulonia

They were named in honour of Ernst Haeckel, whose diagrams of Radiolaria and Phaeodarea contained similar structural features.
