= Expandable graphite =

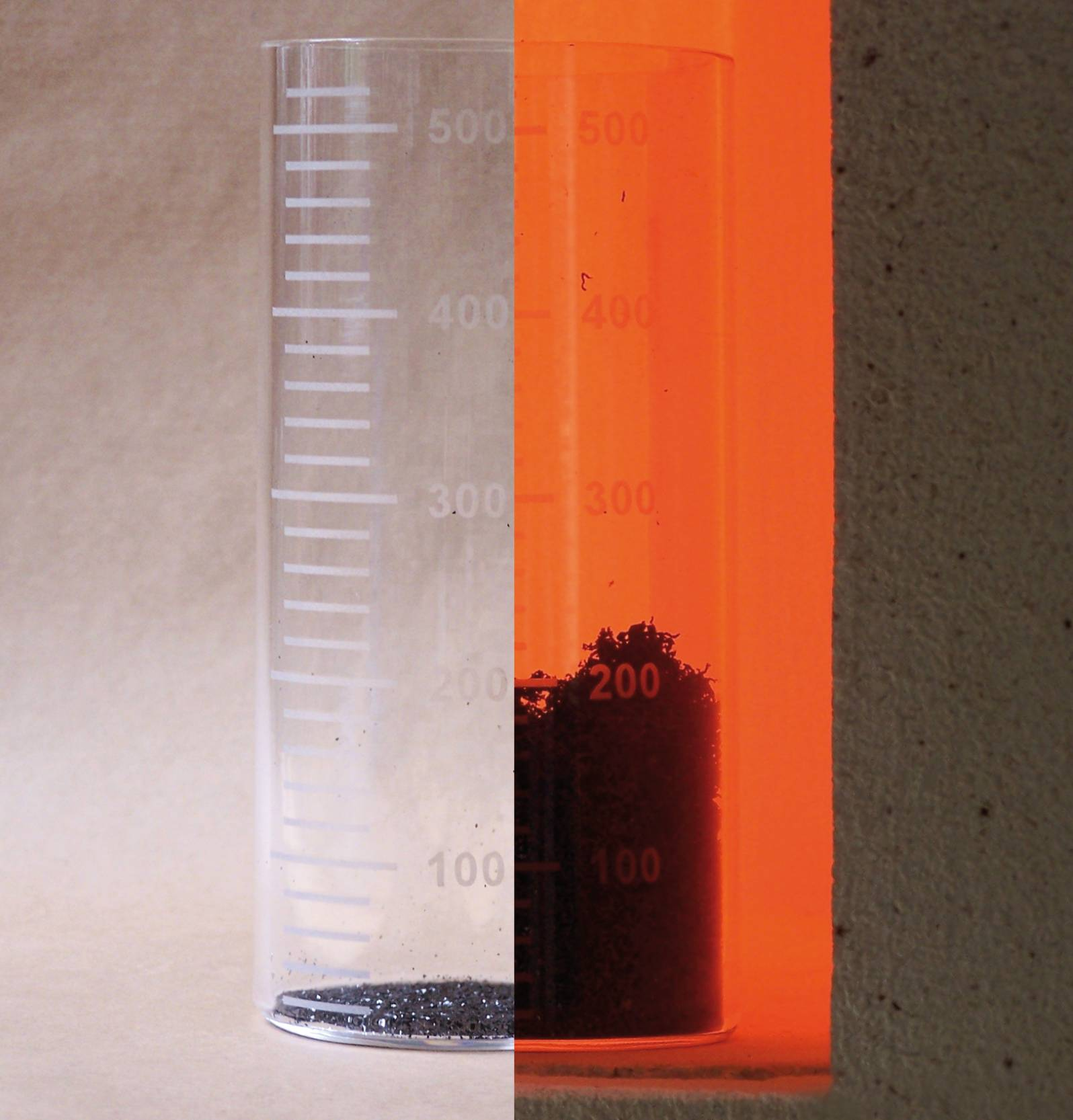
Unexpanded graphite on the left side and the same quantity of graphite, expanded on the right side

Expandable graphite is produced from the naturally occurring mineral graphite. The layered structure of graphite allows some molecules to be intercalated in between the graphite layers. Through incorporation of acids, usually sulfuric acid, graphite can be converted into expandable graphite.

== Characteristics ==
If expandable graphite is heated, the graphite flakes will expand to a multiple of their starting volume. The main products in the market have a starting temperature in the range of 200 °C. The expanded flakes have a “worm-like” appearance and are generally several millimeters long.

Physical characteristics
Carbon content	85%-99%
Expansion rate	30–400 cm^{3}/g
Particle size	80% < 75 μm – 80% > 500 μm
Starting temperature	140 °C-230 °C

== Production ==
To produce expandable graphite, natural graphite flakes are treated in a bath of acid and oxidizing agent. Usually used oxidizing agents are hydrogen peroxide, potassium permanganate or chromic acid. Concentrated sulphuric acid or nitric acid are usually used as the compound to be incorporated, with the reaction taking place at temperatures of 30 °C to 130 °C for up to four hours. After the reaction time, the flakes are washed with water and then dried. Starting temperature and expansion rate depend on the production conditions and particle size of the graphite. Temperature and expansion rate are depending on the degree of fineness of the graphite used.

== Applications ==
=== Flame retardant ===
One of the main applications of expandable graphite is as a flame retardant. When exposed to heat, expandable graphite expands and forms an intumescent layer on the material surface. This slows down the spread of fire and counteracts the most dangerous consequences of fire for humans, the formation of toxic gases and smoke.

=== Graphite foil ===
By compressing expanded graphite, foils can be produced from pure graphite. These are mainly used as thermally and chemically highly resistant seals in chemical plant construction or as heat spreaders.

=== Expandable graphite for metallurgy ===
Expandable graphite is also used in metallurgy to cover melts and moulds. The material serves here as an oxidation protection and insulator.

=== Expandable graphite for the chemical industry ===
Expandable graphite is included in the chemical processes for paints and varnishes.
