= Carbon nanothread =

Carbon crystalline nanomaterial

A carbon nanothread (also called diamond nanothread) is a sp^{3}-bonded, one-dimensional carbon crystalline nanomaterial. The tetrahedral sp^{3}-bonding of its carbon is similar to that of diamond. Nanothreads are only a few atoms across, more than 300,000 times thinner than a human hair. They consist of a stiff, strong carbon core surrounded by hydrogen atoms. Carbon nanotubes, although also one-dimensional nanomaterials, in contrast have sp^{2}-carbon bonding as is found in graphite. The smallest carbon nanothread has a diameter of only 0.2 nanometers, much smaller than the diameter of a single-wall carbon nanotube.

== Synthesis ==
Nanothreads are synthesized by compressing liquid benzene to an extreme pressure of 20 GPa (around 200,000 times the air pressure at the surface of the Earth), and then slowly relieving that pressure. The mechanochemical synthesis reaction can be considered a form of organic solid state chemistry. The benzene chains form extremely thin, tight rings of carbon that are structurally similar to diamonds. Researchers at Cornell University have traced pathways from benzene to nanothreads, which may involve a series of organic [4+2] cycloaddition reactions along stacks of benzene molecules, followed by further reactions of unsaturated bonds. Recently synthesis of macroscopic single crystal arrays of nanothreads hundreds of microns in size has been reported. The order and lack of grain boundaries in single crystals is often very desirable because it facilitates both applications and characterization. In contrast, carbon nanotubes form only thin crystalline ropes. Control of the rate of compression and/or decompression appears to be important to the synthesis of polycrystalline and single crystal nanothreads. Slow compression/decompression may favor low energy reaction pathways. If the synthesis pressure for nanothreads can be reduced to 5 to 6 GPa, which is the pressure used for synthesis of industrial diamond, production on a large scale of >10^{6} kg/yr would be possible. Recent advance on using strained cage-like molecules such as cubane as a precursor has successfully brought down the synthesis pressure to 12 GPa. Expanding the precursor library to non-aromatic, strained molecules offers new avenues to explore scalable production of carbon nanothreads.

The formation of nanothread crystals appears to be guided by uniaxial stress (mechanical stress in a particular single direction), to which the nanothreads consistently align. Reaction to form the crystals is not topochemical, as it involves a major rearrangement from a lower symmetry monoclinic benzene crystal to a higher symmetry hexagonal nanothread crystal. Topochemical reactions generally require commensuration between the periodicities and interatomic distances between reactant and product. The distances between benzene molecules with van der Waals separations between them must shrink by 40% or more as the short, strong covalent carbon-carbon bonds between them form during the nanothread synthesis reaction. Such large changes in geometry usual break up crystal order, but the nanothread reaction instead creates it. Even polycrystalline benzene reacts to form macroscopic single crystal packings of nanothreads hundreds of microns across. Topochemical solid state reactions such as the formation of single crystal polydiacetylenes from diacetylenes usually require a single crystal reactant to form a single crystal product.

The impetus for the formation of a hexagonal crystal appears to be the packing of circular cross section threads. The details of how it is possible to transform from a monoclinic benzene crystal to a hexagonal nanothread crystal are not yet fully understood. Further development of the theory of the effect of pressure on reactions may help.

Organic synthesis efforts towards polytwistane nanothreads have been reported.

Rotating polytwistane, a prototypical nanothread structure. Black atoms are carbon. Light grey atoms are hydrogen.

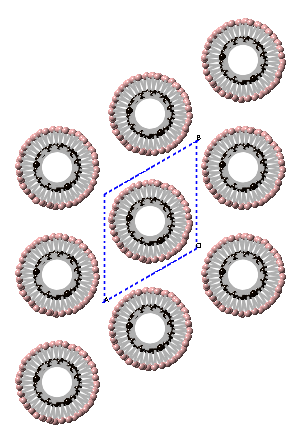
Polytwistane crystal viewed down its hexagonal c axis. Black atoms are carbon and pink atoms are hydrogen. The length of the threads is going into the page, showing their circular cross section and hexagonal packing that (experimentally) extends over hundreds of microns in crystals. The outline of the hexagonal unit cell is shown in blue. These crystals exfoliate into bundles of nanothreads.

== History ==
In popular culture, diamond threads were first described by Arthur C. Clarke in his sci-fi novel The Fountains of Paradise set in the 22nd century, written in 1979.

Nanothreads were first investigated theoretically in 2001 by researchers at Penn State University and later by researchers at Cornell University. In 2014, researchers at Penn State University created the first sp^{3}-carbon nanothreads in collaboration with Oak Ridge National Laboratory and the Carnegie Institution for Science. Prior to 2014, and despite a century of investigation, benzene was thought to produce only hydrogenated amorphous carbon when compressed. As of 2015, threads at least 90 nanometers in length had been created (compared to .5 meters for CNTs).

== Structure ==
Since "diamond nanothreads" are sp^{3}-bonded and one-dimensional they are unique in the matrix of hybridization (sp^{2}/sp^{3}) and dimensionality (0D/1D/2D/3D) for carbon nanomaterials.

Assuming a topological unit cell of one or two benzene rings with at least two bonds interconnecting each adjacent pair of rings, 50 topologically distinct nanothreads have been enumerated. 15 of these are within 80 meV/carbon atom of the most stable member. Some of the more commonly discussed nanothread structures are known informally as polytwistane, tube (3,0), and Polymer I. Polytwistane is chiral. Tube (3,0) can be thought of as the thinnest possible thread that can be carved out of the diamond structure, consisting of stacked cyclohexane rings. Polymer I was predicted to form from benzene at high pressure.

Although there is compelling evidence from two dimensional X-ray diffraction patterns, transmission electron diffraction, and solid-state nuclear magnetic resonance (NMR) for a structure consisting of hexagonally packed crystals of 6.5 Angstrom diameter nanothreads with largely (75 to 80%) sp^{3}-bonding, the atomic structure of nanothreads is still under investigation. Nanothreads have also been observed by transmission electron microscopy. Individual threads have been observed to pack in hexagonal crystals and layer-lines indicative of order along their length have been observed.

Nanothreads have also been classified by their degree of saturation. Fully saturated degree 6 nanothreads have no double bonds remaining. Three bonds form between each pair of benzene molecules. Degree 4 nanothreads have a double bond remaining from benzene and thus only two bonds formed between each pair of benzene molecules. Degree 2 have two double bonds remaining. Unless otherwise specified the term nanothread is assumed to refer to a degree six structure.

NMR has revealed that nanothread crystals consist of both degree 6 and degree 4 threads. Moreover, spin diffusion experiments show that the sections of the threads that are fully saturated degree 6 must be at least 2.5 nm long, if not longer. NMR also shows that no second hydrocarbon or carbon phase is present in nanothread crystals. Thus all of the sp^{2} carbon is either in degree 4 nanothreads or small amounts of aromatic linker molecules, or even smaller amounts of C=O groups. A subsequent 2018 study combining experimental and calculated solid-state NMR further constrained possible atomic structures of nanothreads. ^13C chemical shifts and anisotropies were computed using density functional theory for numerous candidate degree-6 and degree-4 structures and jointly analyzed with one- and two-dimensional NMR data, identifying a minimal set of four plausible structural candidates. The analysis indicated that the data are best described by a specific combination of degree-4 and degree-6 threads, consistent with [4+2] cycloaddition motifs and influenced by structural disorder. NMR provides the chemical structural information necessary to refine syntheses towards pure degree 6 nanothreads, which are stronger than the partially saturated ones.

== Carbon nitride nanothreads ==
Pyridine compressed slowly under pressure forms carbon nitride C_{5}H_{5}N nanothread crystals. They exhibit the six-fold diffraction "signature" of nanothread formation. NMR, chemical analysis and infrared spectroscopy provide further evidence for the synthesis of nanothreads from pyridine. Pyridine nanothreads incorporate significant amounts of nitrogen directly into their backbone. In contrast sp2 carbon nanotubes can only be doped with a small amount of nitrogen. A wide range of other functionalized nanothreads may be possible, as well as nanothreads from polycyclic aromatic hydrocarbon molecules.

== Smallest nanothreads ==
Extending the ability to design and create nanothread architecture from a non-aromatic, saturated molecule has been a recent interest in order to achieve an entirely sp3-bonded nanothread structure. Hypothetical nanothread architectures built from the smallest diamondoids (adamantane) have been proposed to have higher mechanical strength than benzene nanothreads. The first experimental synthesis of a novel purely sp3 bonded one-dimensional carbon nanomaterial is realized via an endogenous solid-state polymerization of cubane. Pre-arranged cubane monomers in the bulk crystal undergo diradical polymerization guided by applied uniaxial stress, similar to benzene, produce a single-crystalline carbon nanomaterial. The cubane-derived nanothread exhibits a linear diamond structure with subnanometre-diameter of 0.2 nm, which is considered as the smallest member in the carbon nanothread family; thus, they promise to form the stiffest one-dimensional system known.

== Properties ==
Every type of nanothread has a very high Young's modulus (stiffness). The value for the strongest type of nanothread is around 900 GPa compared to steel at 200 GPa and diamond at over 1,200 GPa. The strength of carbon nanothreads may rival or exceed that of carbon nanotubes (CNTs). Molecular dynamics and Density functional theory simulations have indicated a stiffness on the order of carbon nanotubes (approx. 850 GPa) and a specific strength of approx. 4 × 10^{7} N·m/kg.

Much as graphite exfoliates into sheets and ultimately graphene, nanothread crystals exfoliate into fibers, consistent with their structure consisting of stiff, straight threads with a persistence length of ~100 nm that are held together with van der Waals forces. These fibers exhibit birefringence, as would be expected from their low dimensional character. In contrast, most polymers are much more flexible and often fold into crystalline lamella (see Crystallization of polymers) rather than forming into crystals that readily exfoliate.

Modeling suggests certain nanothreads may be auxetic, with a negative Poisson ratio. The thermal conductivity of nanothreads has been modeled. Modeling indicates their Bandgaps are tunable with strain over a wide range. The electrical conductivity of fully saturated nanothreads, driven by topology, may be much higher than expected.

== Potential applications ==
Nanothreads can be thought of essentially as "flexible diamond". The extremely high specific strength predicted for them by modeling has attracted attention for applications such as space elevators and would be useful in other applications related to transportation, aerospace, and sports equipment. They may uniquely combine extreme strength, flexibility, and resilience. Chemically substituted nanothreads may facilitate load transfer between neighbors through covalent bonding to transfer their mechanical strength to a surrounding matrix. Modeling also suggests that the kinks associated with Stone-Wales transformations in nanothreads may facilitate interfacial load transfer to a surrounding matrix, making them useful for high strength composites. In contrast to carbon nanotubes, bonds to the exterior of nanothreads need not disrupt their carbon core because only three of the four tetrahedral bonds are needed form it. The "extra" bond usually formed to hydrogen could be instead be linked to another nanothread or another molecule or atom. Nanothreads may thus be thought of as "hybrids" that are both hydrocarbon molecules and carbon nanomaterials. Bonds to carbon nanotubes require their carbon to change from near planar sp^{2}-bonding to tetrahedral sp^{3}-bonding, thus disrupting their tubular geometry and possibly weakening them. Nanothreads may be less susceptible to loss of strength through defects than carbon nanotubes. Thus far the extreme strength predicted for carbon nanotubes has largely not been realized in practical applications because of issues with load transfer to the surroundings and defects at various length scales from that of atoms on up.

Exfoliation into individual nanothreads may be possible, facilitating further functionalization and assembly into functional materials. Theory indicates that "caged saturated hydrocarbons offering multiple σ-conductance channels (such as nanothreads) afford transmission far beyond what could be expected based upon conventional superposition laws, particularly if these pathways are composed entirely from quaternary carbon atoms."

The carbon core of nanothreads is very stiff relative to the backbone of conventional polymers. They should thus be able to precisely orient molecular functions attached along their length (by substitution of hydrogen) relative to each other and to heteroatoms or unsaturated bonds in their backbone. These features may enable biological applications, for example. Defects, functional groups, and/or heteroatoms incorporated either into or exterior to the backbone of nanothreads with controlled orientation and distance between them may allow for robust, well controlled fluorescence. Doping and incorporation of heteroatoms such as nitrogen or boron into the nanothread backbone may allow for enhanced conducting or semiconducting properties of nanothreads that allow for application as photocatalysts, electron emitters, or possibly superconductors.

Modeling suggests carbon nanothread resonators exhibit low dissipation and may be useful as chemical sensors that can detect very small mass changes.

=== Energy storage ===
Simulations show some achiral nanothread bundles may have specific energy density (when twisted) higher than lithium batteries.

== See also ==
- Carbon nanotube
- Boron nitride nanotube
- Buckypaper
- Carbide-derived carbon
- Carbon nanocone
- Carbon nanofibers
- Carbon nanoparticles
- Carbon nanoscrolls
- Carbon nanotube chemistry
- Colossal carbon tube
- Filamentous carbon
- Graphene oxide paper
- List of software for nanostructures modeling
- Molecular modelling
- Nanoflower
- Diamondoid
- Graphene
- Graphane
- Ninithi (nanotube modelling software)
- Organic semiconductor
- Selective chemistry of single-walled nanotubes
- Silicon nanotubes
- Timeline of carbon nanotubes
