= Optical properties of carbon nanotubes =

The optical properties of carbon nanotubes are highly relevant for materials science. The way carbon nanotubes interact with electromagnetic radiation is unique in many respects, as evidenced by their peculiar absorption, photoluminescence (fluorescence), and Raman spectra.

Carbon nanotubes are unique "one-dimensional" materials, whose hollow fibers (tubes) have a unique and highly ordered atomic and electronic structure, and can be made in a wide range of dimension. The diameter typically varies from 0.4 to 40 nm (i.e., a range of ~100 times). However, the length can reach 55.5 cm (21.9 in), implying a length-to-diameter ratio as high as 132,000,000:1; which is unequaled by any other material. Consequently, all the electronic, optical, electrochemical and mechanical properties of the carbon nanotubes are extremely anisotropic (directionally dependent) and tunable.

Applications of carbon nanotubes in optics and photonics are still less developed than in other fields. Some properties that may lead to practical use include tuneability and wavelength selectivity. Potential applications that have been demonstrated include light emitting diodes (LEDs), bolometers and optoelectronic memory.

Apart from direct applications, the optical properties of carbon nanotubes can be very useful in their manufacture and application to other fields. Spectroscopic methods offer the possibility of quick and non-destructive characterization of relatively large amounts of carbon nanotubes, yielding detailed measurements of non-tubular carbon content, tube type and chirality, structural defects, and many other properties that are relevant to those other applications.

== Geometric structure ==
=== Chiral angle ===
A single-walled carbon nanotube (SWNT or SWCNT) can be envisioned as strip of a graphene molecule (a single sheet of graphite) rolled and joined into a cylinder. The structure of the nanotube can be characterized by the width of the diameter d of the tube and the angle (θ) of the strip relative to the main symmetry axes of the hexagonal graphene lattice. This angle, which varies from 0 to 30 degrees, is called the "chiral angle" of the tube and varies dependent on the conditions of nanotube growth.

=== (n, m) notation ===
A "sliced and unrolled" representation of a carbon nanotube as a strip of a graphene molecule, overlaid on a diagram of the full molecule (faint background). The vector w (large blue arrow) connects corresponding positions on the two edges of the strip. Since w = 3u + 1v, the tube is said to be of type (3,1).

The nanotube structure can be described by two integer indices (n,m) that describe the width and direction of that hypothetical strip as coordinates in a fundamental reference frame of the graphene lattice. If the atoms around any 6-member ring of the graphene are numbered sequentially from 1 to 6, the two vectors u and v of that frame are the displacements from atom 1 to atoms 3 and 5, respectively. Those two vectors have the same length, and their directions are 60 degrees apart. The vector w = n u + m v is then interpreted as the circumference of the unrolled tube on the graphene lattice; it relates each point A1 on one edge of the strip to the point A2 on the other edge that will be identified with it as the strip is rolled up. The chiral angle α is then the angle between u and w.

The pairs (n, m) that describe distinct tube structures are those with 0 ≤ m ≤ n and n > 0. All geometric properties of the tube, such as diameter, chiral angle, and symmetries, can be computed from these indices.

The type also determines the electronic structure of the tube. Specifically, the tube behaves like a metal if m − n is a multiple of 3, and like a semiconductor otherwise. Thus, across the available indices, one third of SWNTs are metallic, and two thirds are semiconducting. Truly metallic carbon nanotubes with minimal to nonexistent band gap have been defined only as those where n = m.

=== Zigzag and armchair tubes ===
Tubes of type (n, m) with n = m (chiral angle = 30°) are called "armchair" and those with m = 0 (chiral angle = 0°) "zigzag". All other chiral angles produce what are known as chiral nanotubes.

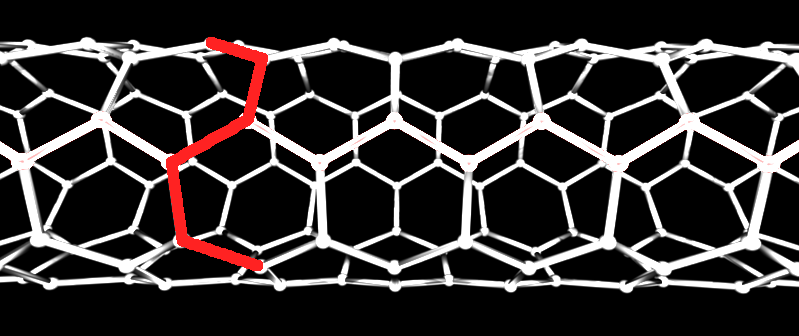
Armchair nanotube

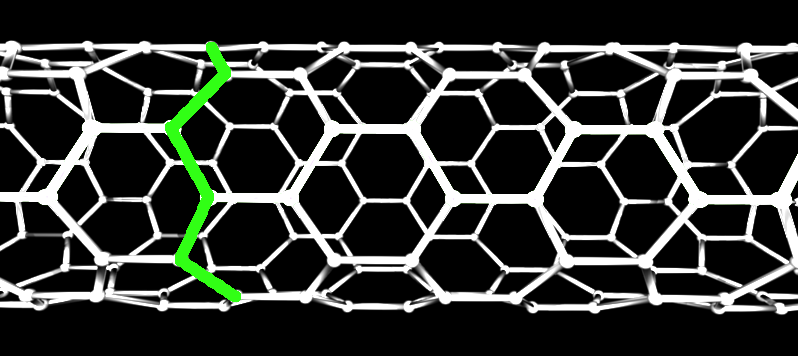
Zigzag nanotube

== Electronic structure ==
The optical properties of carbon nanotubes are largely determined by their unique electronic structure. The rolling up of the graphene lattice affects that structure in ways that depend strongly on the geometric structure type (n, m).

=== Van Hove singularities ===
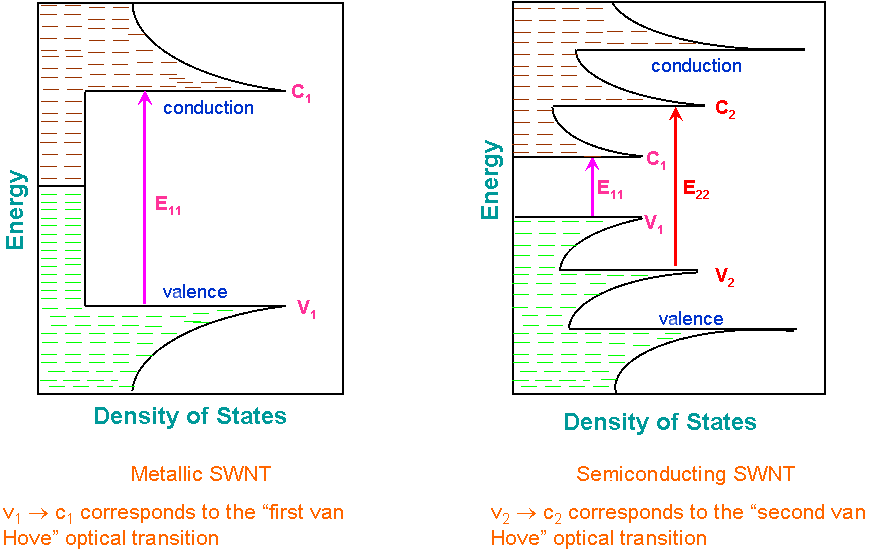

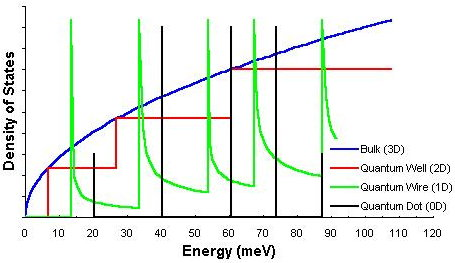
A bulk 3D material (blue) has continuous DOS, but a 1D wire (green) has Van Hove singularities.

A characteristic feature of one-dimensional crystals is that their distribution of density of states (DOS) is not a continuous function of energy, but it descends gradually and then increases in a discontinuous spike. These sharp peaks are called Van Hove singularities. In contrast, three-dimensional (bulk) materials have continuous DOS.

Van Hove singularities result in the following optical properties of carbon nanotubes:

- Optical transitions occur between the v_{1} − c_{1}, v_{2} − c_{2}, etc., states of semiconducting or metallic nanotubes and are traditionally labeled as S_{11}, S_{22}, M_{11}, etc., or, if the "conductivity" of the tube is unknown or unimportant, as E_{11}, E_{22}, etc. Crossover transitions c_{1} − v_{2}, c_{2} − v_{1}, etc., are dipole-forbidden and thus are extremely weak, but they were possibly observed using cross-polarized optical geometry.
- The energies between the Van Hove singularities depend on the nanotube structure. Thus by varying this structure, one can tune the optoelectronic properties of carbon nanotube. Such fine tuning has been experimentally demonstrated using UV illumination of polymer-dispersed CNTs.
- Optical transitions are rather sharp (~10 meV) and strong. Consequently, it is relatively easy to selectively excite nanotubes having certain (n, m) indices, as well as to detect optical signals from individual nanotubes.

=== Kataura plot ===
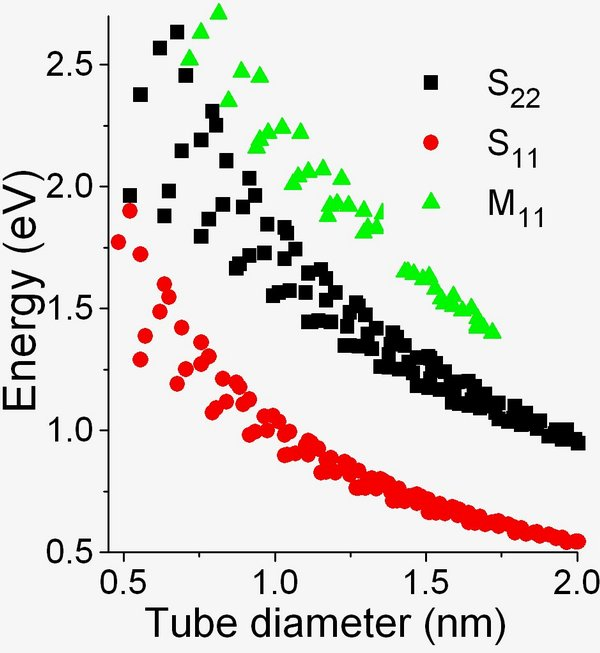
In this Kataura plot, the energy of an electronic transition decreases as the diameter of the nanotube increases.

The band structure of carbon nanotubes having certain (n, m) indexes can be calculated. A theoretical graph based on these calculations was designed in 1999 by Hiromichi Kataura to rationalize experimental findings. A Kataura plot relates the nanotube diameter and its bandgap energies for all nanotubes in a diameter range. The oscillating shape of every branch of the Kataura plot reflects the intrinsic strong dependence of the SWNT properties on the (n, m) index rather than on its diameter.

== Optical properties ==
=== Optical absorption ===
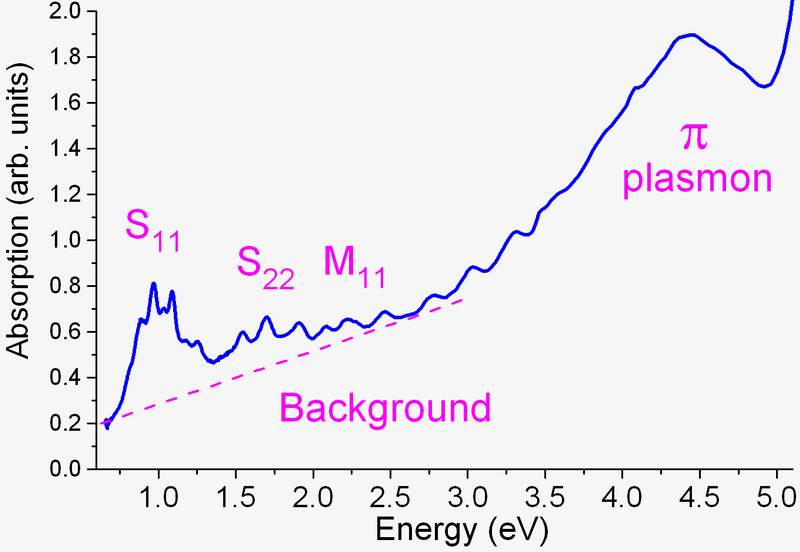
Optical absorption spectrum from dispersed single-wall carbon nanotubes

Optical absorption in carbon nanotubes differs from absorption in conventional 3D materials by presence of sharp peaks (1D nanotubes) instead of an absorption threshold followed by an absorption increase (most 3D solids). Absorption in nanotubes originates from electronic transitions from the v_{2} to c_{2} (energy E_{22}) or v_{1} to c_{1} (E_{11}) levels, etc. The transitions are relatively sharp and can be used to identify nanotube types. Note that the sharpness deteriorates with increasing energy, and that many nanotubes have very similar E_{22} or E_{11} energies, and thus significant overlap occurs in absorption spectra. This overlap is avoided in photoluminescence mapping measurements (see below), which instead of a combination of overlapped transitions identifies individual (E_{22}, E_{11}) pairs.

Interactions between nanotubes, such as bundling, broaden optical lines. While bundling strongly affects photoluminescence, it has much weaker effect on optical absorption and Raman scattering. Consequently, sample preparation for the latter two techniques is relatively simple.

Optical absorption is routinely used to quantify quality of the carbon nanotube powders.

The spectrum is analyzed in terms of intensities of nanotube-related peaks, background and pi-carbon peak; the latter two mostly originate from non-nanotube carbon in contaminated samples. However, it has been recently shown that by aggregating nearly single chirality semiconducting nanotubes into closely packed Van der Waals bundles the absorption background can be attributed to free carrier transition originating from intertube charge transfer.

=== Carbon nanotubes as a black body ===
An ideal black body should have emissivity or absorbance of 1.0, which is difficult to attain in practice, especially in a wide spectral range. Vertically aligned "forests" of single-wall carbon nanotubes can have absorbances of 0.98–0.99 from the far-ultraviolet (200 nm) to far-infrared (200 μm) wavelengths.

These SWNT forests (buckypaper) were grown by the super-growth CVD method to about 10 μm height. Two factors could contribute to strong light absorption by these structures: (i) a distribution of CNT chiralities resulted in various bandgaps for individual CNTs. Thus a compound material was formed with broadband absorption. (ii) Light might be trapped in those forests due to multiple reflections.

Reflectance measurements
	UV-to-near IR	Near-to-mid IR	Mid-to-far IR
Wavelength, μm	0.2–2	2–20	25–200
Incident angle, °	8	5	10
Reflection	Hemispherical-directional	Hemispherical-directional	Specular
Reference	White reflectance standard	Gold mirror	Aluminum mirror
Average reflectance	0.0160	0.0097	0.0017
Standard deviation	0.0048	0.0041	0.0027

=== Luminescence ===
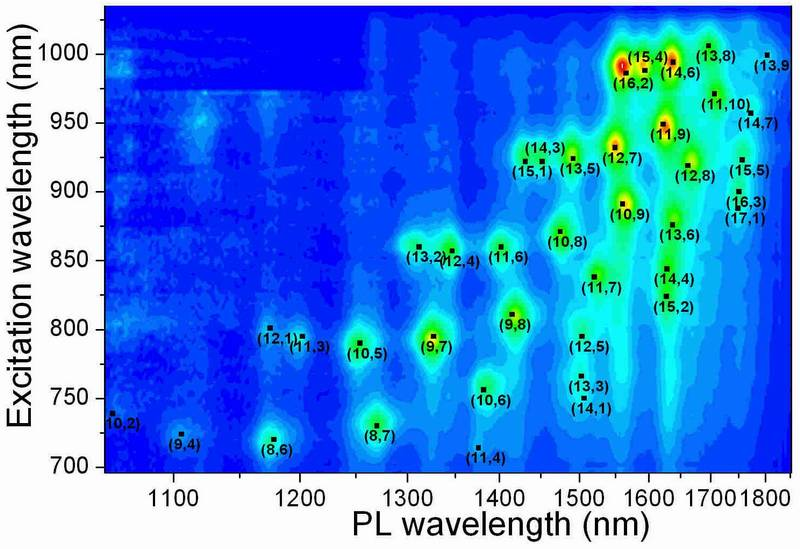
Photoluminescence map from single-wall carbon nanotubes. (n, m) indexes identify certain semiconducting nanotubes. Note that PL measurements do not detect metallic nanotubes with n = m or m = 0.

==== Photoluminescence (fluorescence) ====
Semiconducting single-walled carbon nanotubes emit near-infrared light upon photoexcitation, described interchangeably as fluorescence or photoluminescence (PL). The excitation of PL usually occurs as follows: an electron in a nanotube absorbs excitation light via S_{22} transition, creating an electron-hole pair (exciton). Both electron and hole rapidly relax (via phonon-assisted processes) from c_{2} to c_{1} and from v_{2} to v_{1} states, respectively. Then they recombine through a c_{1} − v_{1} transition resulting in light emission.

No excitonic luminescence can be produced in metallic tubes. Their electrons can be excited, thus resulting in optical absorption, but the holes are immediately filled by other electrons out of the many available in the metal. Therefore, no excitons are produced.

==== Salient properties ====
- Photoluminescence from SWNT, as well as optical absorption and Raman scattering, is linearly polarized along the tube axis. This allows monitoring of the SWNTs orientation without direct microscopic observation.
- PL is quick: relaxation typically occurs within 100 picoseconds.
- PL efficiency was first found to be low (~0.01%), but later studies measured much higher quantum yields. By improving the structural quality and isolation of nanotubes, emission efficiency increased. A quantum yield of 1% was reported in nanotubes sorted by diameter and length through gradient centrifugation, and it was further increased to 20% by optimizing the procedure of isolating individual nanotubes in solution.
- The spectral range of PL is rather wide. Emission wavelength can vary between 0.8 and 2.1 micrometers depending on the nanotube structure.
- Excitons are apparently delocalized over several nanotubes in single chirality bundles as the photoluminescence spectrum displays a splitting consistent with intertube exciton tunneling.
- Interaction between nanotubes or between a nanotube and another material may quench or increase PL. No PL is observed in multi-walled carbon nanotubes. PL from double-wall carbon nanotubes strongly depends on the preparation method: CVD grown DWCNTs show emission both from inner and outer shells. However, DWCNTs produced by encapsulating fullerenes into SWNTs and annealing show PL only from the outer shells. Isolated SWNTs lying on the substrate show extremely weak PL which has been detected in few studies only. Detachment of the tubes from the substrate drastically increases PL.
- Position of the (S_{22}, S_{11}) PL peaks depends slightly (within 2%) on the nanotube environment (air, dispersant, etc.). However, the shift depends on the (n, m) index, and thus the whole PL map not only shifts, but also warps upon changing the CNT medium.

=== Raman scattering ===
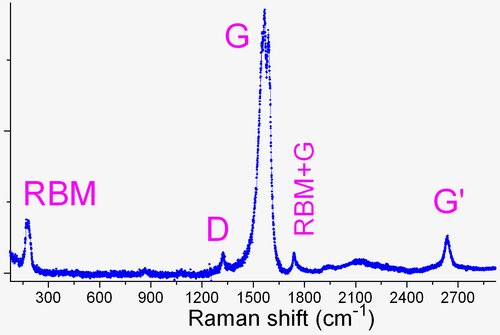
Raman spectrum of single-wall carbon nanotubes

Raman spectroscopy has good spatial resolution (~0.5 micrometers) and sensitivity (single nanotubes); it requires only minimal sample preparation and is rather informative. Consequently, Raman spectroscopy is probably the most popular technique of carbon nanotube characterization. Raman scattering in SWNTs is resonant, i.e., only those tubes are probed which have one of the bandgaps equal to the exciting laser energy. Several scattering modes dominate the SWNT spectrum, as discussed below.

Similar to photoluminescence mapping, the energy of the excitation light can be scanned in Raman measurements, thus producing Raman maps. Those maps also contain oval-shaped features uniquely identifying (n, m) indices. Contrary to PL, Raman mapping detects not only semiconducting but also metallic tubes, and it is less sensitive to nanotube bundling than PL. However, requirement of a tunable laser and a dedicated spectrometer is a strong technical impediment.

==== Radial breathing mode ====
Radial breathing mode (RBM) corresponds to radial expansion-contraction of the nanotube. Therefore, its frequency ν_{RBM} (in cm^{−1}) depends on the nanotube diameter d as, ν_{RBM} = A/d + B (where A and B are constants dependent on the environment in which the nanotube is present. For example, B=0 for individual nanotubes.) (in nanometers) and can be estimated as ν_{RBM} = 234/d + 10 for SWNT or ν_{RBM} = 248/d for DWNT, which is very useful in deducing the CNT diameter from the RBM position. Typical RBM range is 100–350 cm^{−1}. If RBM intensity is particularly strong, its weak second overtone can be observed at double frequency.

==== Bundling mode ====
The bundling mode is a special form of RBM supposedly originating from collective vibration in a bundle of SWNTs.

==== G mode ====
Another very important mode is the G mode (G from graphite). This mode corresponds to planar vibrations of carbon atoms and is present in most graphite-like materials. G band in SWNT is shifted to lower frequencies relative to graphite (1580 cm^{−1}) and is split into several peaks. The splitting pattern and intensity depend on the tube structure and excitation energy; they can be used, though with much lower accuracy compared to RBM mode, to estimate the tube diameter and whether the tube is metallic or semiconducting.

==== D mode ====
D mode is present in all graphite-like carbons and originates from structural defects. Therefore, the ratio of the G/D modes is conventionally used to quantify the structural quality of carbon nanotubes. High-quality nanotubes have this ratio significantly higher than 100. At a lower functionalisation of the nanotube, the G/D ratio remains almost unchanged. This ratio gives an idea of the functionalisation of a nanotube.

==== G′ mode ====
The name of this mode is misleading: it is given because in graphite, this mode is usually the second strongest after the G mode. However, it is actually the second overtone of the defect-induced D mode (and thus should logically be named D′). Its intensity is stronger than that of the D mode due to different selection rules. In particular, D mode is forbidden in the ideal nanotube and requires a structural defect, providing a phonon of certain angular momentum, to be induced. In contrast, G′ mode involves a "self-annihilating" pair of phonons and thus does not require defects. The spectral position of G′ mode depends on diameter, so it can be used roughly to estimate the SWNT diameter. In particular, G′ mode is a doublet in double-wall carbon nanotubes, but the doublet is often unresolved due to line broadening.

Other overtones, such as a combination of RBM+G mode at ~1750 cm^{−1}, are frequently seen in CNT Raman spectra. However, they are less important and are not considered here.

==== Anti-Stokes scattering ====
All the above Raman modes can be observed both as Stokes and anti-Stokes scattering. As mentioned above, Raman scattering from CNTs is resonant in nature, i.e. only tubes whose band gap energy is similar to the laser energy are excited. The difference between those two energies, and thus the band gap of individual tubes, can be estimated from the intensity ratio of the Stokes/anti-Stokes lines. This estimate however relies on the temperature factor (Boltzmann factor), which is often miscalculated – a focused laser beam is used in the measurement, which can locally heat the nanotubes without changing the overall temperature of the studied sample.

=== Rayleigh scattering ===
Carbon nanotubes have very large aspect ratio, i.e., their length is much larger than their diameter. Consequently, as expected from the classical electromagnetic theory, elastic light scattering (or Rayleigh scattering) by straight CNTs has anisotropic angular dependence, and from its spectrum, the band gaps of individual nanotubes can be deduced.

Another manifestation of Rayleigh scattering is the "antenna effect", an array of nanotubes standing on a substrate has specific angular and spectral distributions of reflected light, and both those distributions depend on the nanotube length.

== Applications ==
Light emitting diodes (LEDs) and photo-detectors based on a single nanotube have been produced in the lab. Their unique feature is not the efficiency, which is yet relatively low, but the narrow selectivity in the wavelength of emission and detection of light and the possibility of its fine tuning through the nanotube structure. In addition, bolometer and optoelectronic memory devices have been realised on ensembles of single-walled carbon nanotubes.

- Photoluminescence is used for characterization purposes to measure the quantities of semiconducting nanotube species in a sample. Nanotubes are isolated (dispersed) using an appropriate chemical agent ("dispersant") to reduce the intertube quenching. Then PL is measured, scanning both the excitation and emission energies and thereby producing a PL map. The ovals in the map define (S_{22}, S_{11}) pairs, which unique identify (n, m) index of a tube. The data of Weisman and Bachilo are conventionally used for the identification.
- Nanotube fluorescence has been investigated for the purposes of imaging and sensing in biomedical applications.

=== Sensitization ===
Optical properties, including the PL efficiency, can be modified by encapsulating organic dyes (carotene, lycopene, etc.) inside the tubes. Efficient energy transfer occurs between the encapsulated dye and nanotube – light is efficiently absorbed by the dye and without significant loss is transferred to the SWNT. Thus potentially, optical properties of a carbon nanotube can be controlled by encapsulating certain molecule inside it. Besides, encapsulation allows isolation and characterization of organic molecules which are unstable under ambient conditions. For example, Raman spectra are extremely difficult to measure from dyes because of their strong PL (efficiency close to 100%). However, encapsulation of dye molecules inside SWNTs completely quenches dye PL, thus allowing measurement and analysis of their Raman spectra.

=== Cathodoluminescence ===
Cathodoluminescence (CL) – light emission excited by electron beam – is a process commonly observed in TV screens. An electron beam can be finely focused and scanned across the studied material. This technique is widely used to study defects in semiconductors and nanostructures with nanometer-scale spatial resolution. It would be beneficial to apply this technique to carbon nanotubes. However, no reliable CL, i.e. sharp peaks assignable to certain (n, m) indices, has been detected from carbon nanotubes yet.

=== Electroluminescence ===
If appropriate electrical contacts are attached to a nanotube, electron-hole pairs (excitons) can be generated by injecting electrons and holes from the contacts. Subsequent exciton recombination results in electroluminescence (EL). Electroluminescent devices have been produced from single nanotubes and their macroscopic assemblies. Recombination appears to proceed via triplet-triplet annihilation giving distinct peaks corresponding to E_{11} and E_{22} transitions.

== See also ==
- Allotropes of carbon
- Buckypaper
- Carbon nanotube
- Carbon nanotubes in photovoltaics
- Graphene
- Hiromichi Kataura
- Mechanical properties of carbon nanotubes
- Nanoflower
- Potential applications of carbon nanotubes
- Resonance Raman spectroscopy
- Selective chemistry of single-walled nanotubes
- Vantablack, a substance produced in 2014; one of the blackest substances known

== Sources ==
- Srikanth, Namburu; Kumar, Anitha C. (2022). "History of Carbon Nanotubes". In Abraham, Jiji; Thomas, Sabu; Kalarikkal, Nandakumar (eds.). Handbook of Carbon Nanotubes. Cham: Springer International Publishing. pp. 3–24. doi:10.1007/978-3-030-91346-5. ISBN 978-3-030-91345-8.
- Maruyama, T. (2022). "Carbon Nanotube Growth Mechanisms". In Abraham, Jiji; Thomas, Sabu; Kalarikkal, Nandakumar (eds.). Handbook of Carbon Nanotubes. Cham: Springer International Publishing. pp. 57–88. doi:10.1007/978-3-030-91346-5. ISBN 978-3-030-91345-8.
- Abhisha, V. S.; Stephen, Ranimol (2022). "Optical Properties of Carbon Nanotubes". In Abraham, Jiji; Thomas, Sabu; Kalarikkal, Nandakumar (eds.). Handbook of Carbon Nanotubes. Cham: Springer International Publishing. pp. 131–148. doi:10.1007/978-3-030-91346-5. ISBN 978-3-030-91345-8.
- Sánchez-Romate, Xoan F.; Jiménez-Suárez, Alberto; Ureña, Alejandro (2022). "Electrical Properties of Carbon Nanotubes". In Abraham, Jiji; Thomas, Sabu; Kalarikkal, Nandakumar (eds.). Handbook of Carbon Nanotubes. Cham: Springer International Publishing. pp. 213–248. doi:10.1007/978-3-030-91346-5. ISBN 978-3-030-91345-8.
- Ayeleru, Olusola Olaitan; Modekwe, Helen Uchenna; Tobias, Nyam Tarhemba; Onu, Matthew Adah; Mamo, Messai Adenew; Moothi, Kapil; Daramola, Michael Olawale; Olubambi, Peter Apata (2022). "Innovative Approaches in Characterization of Carbon Nanotubes". In Abraham, Jiji; Thomas, Sabu; Kalarikkal, Nandakumar (eds.). Handbook of Carbon Nanotubes. Cham: Springer International Publishing. pp. 109–130. doi:10.1007/978-3-030-91346-5. ISBN 978-3-030-91345-8.
- Maruyama, Takahiro (2021). "Carbon nanotubes". In Thomas, Sabu; Sarathchandran, C.; Ilangovan, S.A.; Moreno-Piraján, Juan Carlos (eds.). Handbook of Carbon-Based Nanomaterials. Elsevier. pp. 299–319. doi:10.1016/B978-0-12-821996-6.00009-9. ISBN 978-0-12-821996-6.
