= Frit compression =

Frit compression is the technique used to fabricate buckypaper and buckydiscs from a suspension of carbon nanotubes in a solvent. This is a quick, efficient method over surfactant-casting or acid oxidation filtration of carbon nanotubes.

== Background ==
Traditional methods of buckypaper production involves the use of surfactants to disperse carbon nanotubes into aqueous solutions. It was found that filtering this suspension allowed the nanotubes to pack together in a paper-like mat, thus coining the term "buckypaper" (bucky being the reference to the buckminsterfullerene molecule). The problem was the difficulty in removing the surfactant afterwards, where the surfactant has been linked with cell lysis and tissue inflammation.

Acid oxidation of carbon nanotubes can also be used in filtration to form buckypaper, but requires a high degree of surface acidic groups in order to obtain efficient dispersal in aqueous solution.

== Synthesis ==
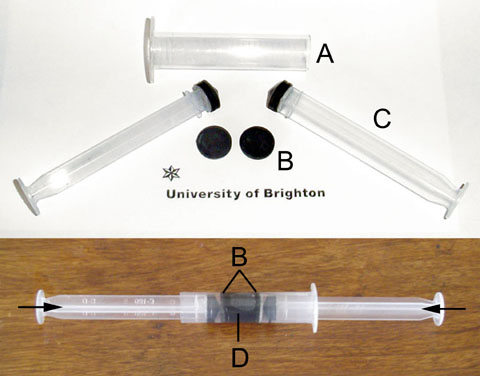
A frit compression system for casting buckypaper

An alternative casting method was developed in 2008 to produce buckypaper that did not require the use of surfactants or the acid oxidation of carbon nanotubes in order to obtain high-purity buckypaper for biomedical applications.

The frit-compression system was adapted from a Solid phase extraction (SPE) column, where a suspension of carbon nanotubes is squeezed between two polypropylene frits (70 micrometre pore diameter) inside a syringe column. The pore structure of the frit allows a rapid exit of the solvent leaving the carbon nanotubes to be pressed together. The presence of the solvent controls the interaction between the tubes allowing the formation of tube-tube junctions; its surface tension directly affects the overlap of adjoining nanotubes thus gaining control over the porosity and pore diameter distribution of buckypaper. The distribution of carbon nanotubes in solvent does not have to be a stable suspension, rather a general dispersion serves much easier to keep the nanotubes between the frits rather than pass through them.

Once the system is compressed, the frit-carbon nanotube sandwich is removed from the syringe housing and allowed to dry. The frits can then be removed to leave intact buckypaper. This methodology rapidly speeds up the casting process, avoids use of surfactants and acid oxidation, and the solvent can be fully recovered.

== Variety ==
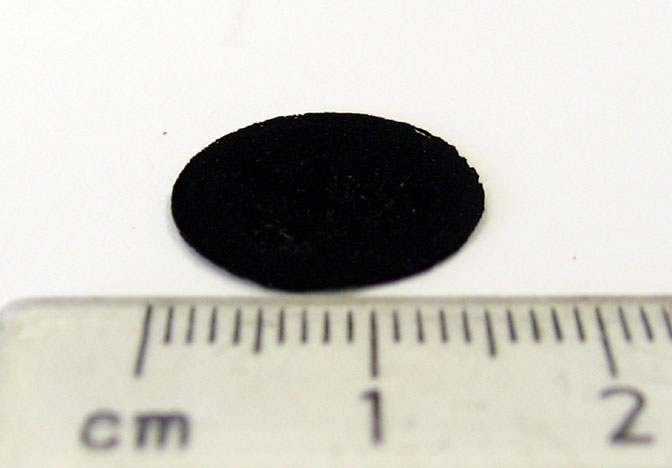
Buckypaper from frit compression of multi-walled carbon nanotubes

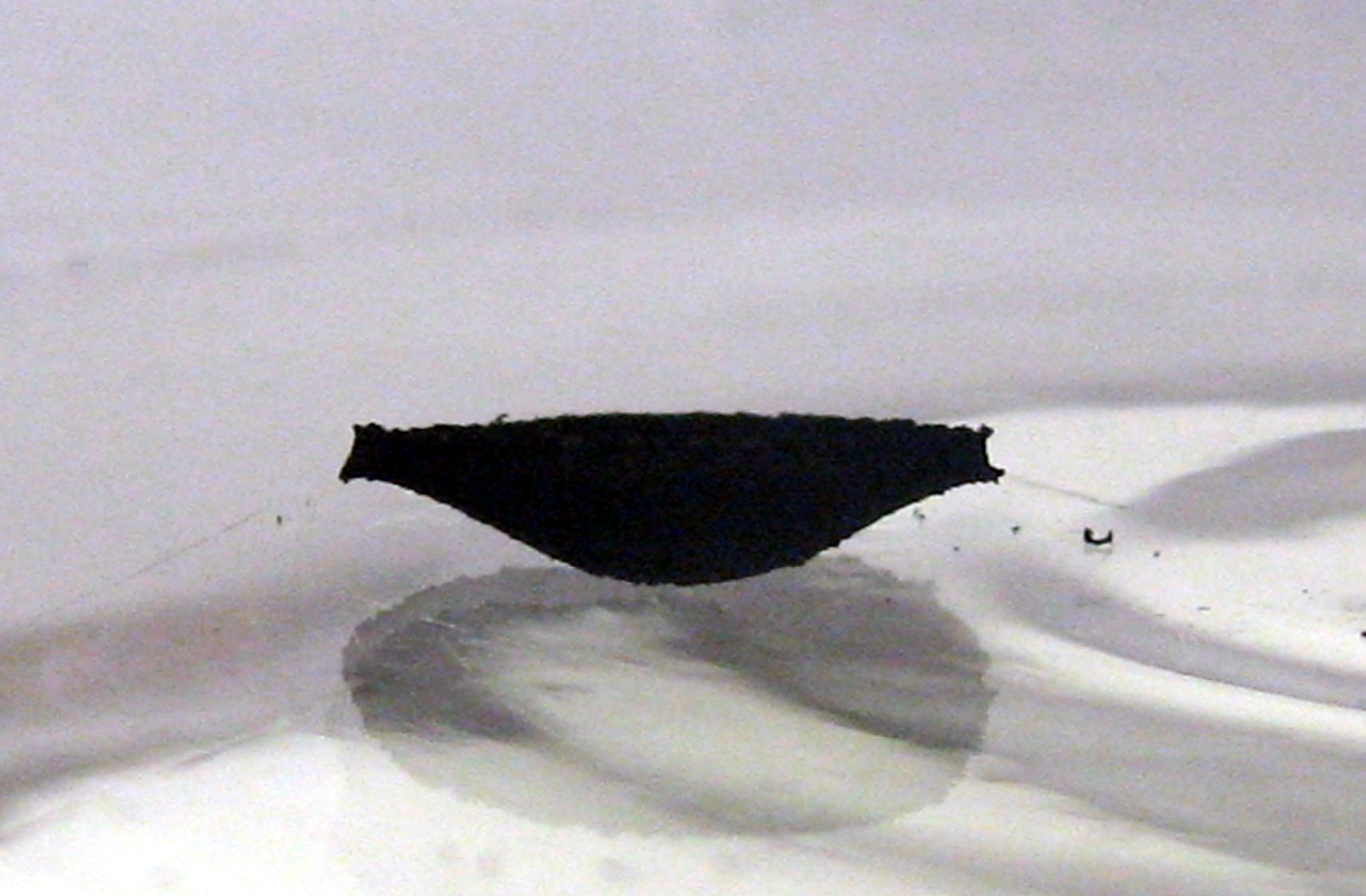
A water-cast buckydisc with convex lower surface

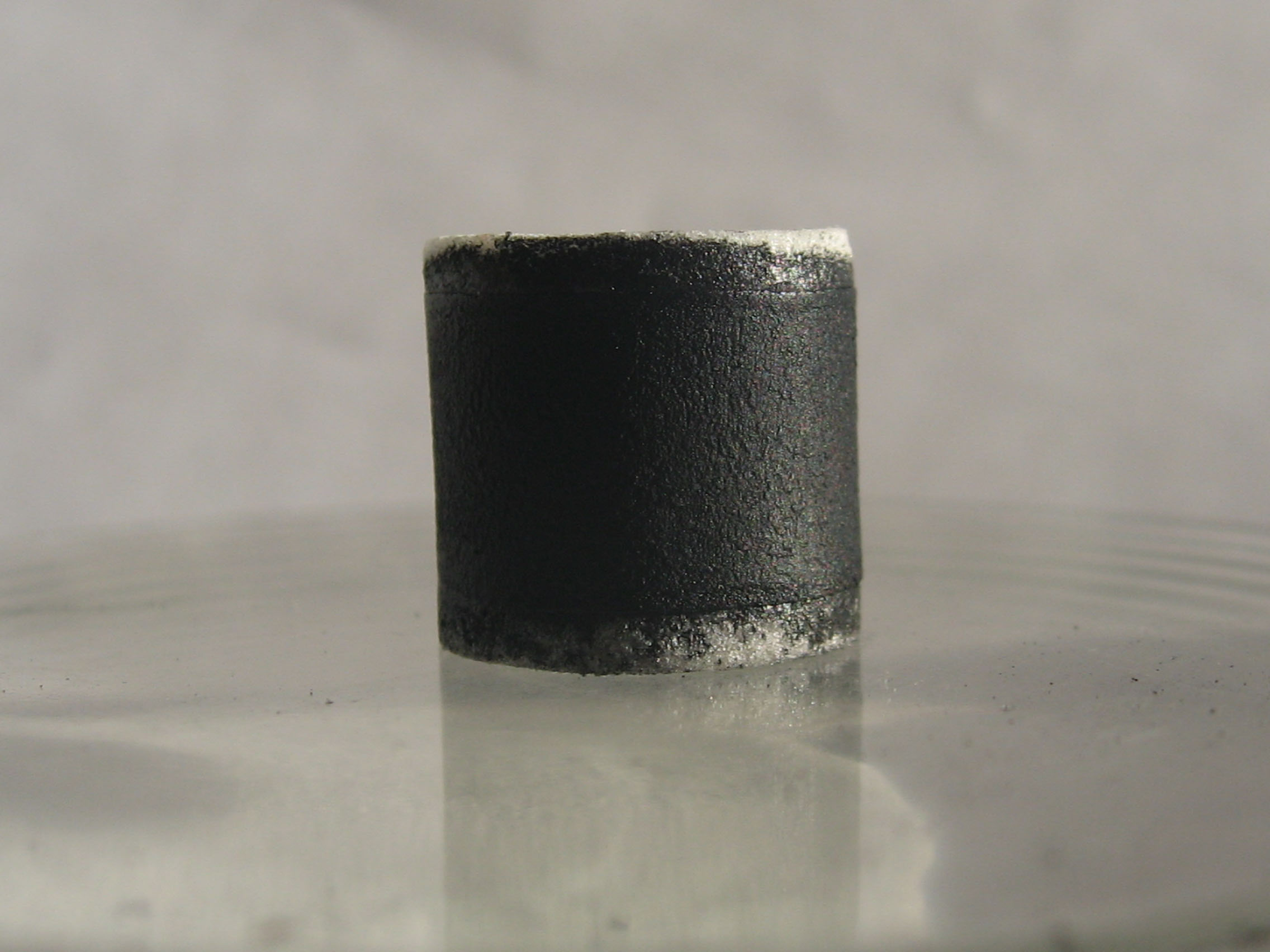
Buckycolumn just after casting

Buckycolumn with hyperboloid geometry on drying

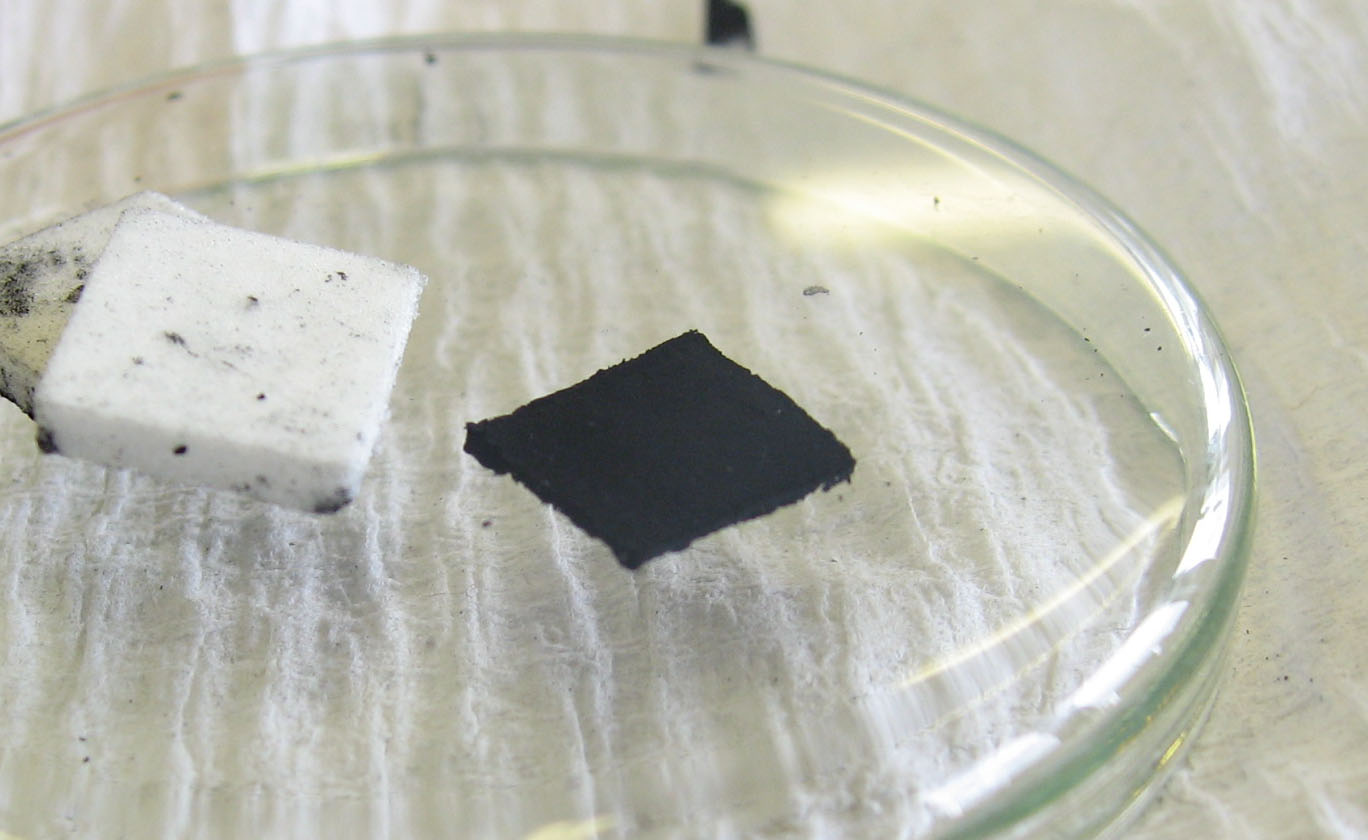
Buckyprism with casting frit

The cross-sectional geometry of the syringe housing will determine the final structure of the buckypaper and the amount of carbon nanotubes added to the column will affect the height of the carbon nanotube mat. Although there is currently no formal classification for paper, discs and columns, it was deemed necessary to differentiate between the different structures obtained for research purposes.

=== Buckypaper ===
Typically, cylindrical columns are used with a few milligrams of carbon nanotubes in a solvent. This generates buckypaper with a circular cross-section and film heights of a few hundred micrometres. Buckypaper is usually a class of carbon nanotube mats with depths from 1 to 500 micrometres.

=== Buckydiscs ===
Buckypaper with a height that is larger than 500 micrometres (0.5 mm) is called a buckydisc, being thicker than buckypaper and not paper-like. Moreover, when casting in water, the edges of the film can lift due to surface tension effects of the remaining solvent in the system that can pull carbon nanotubes closer together.

=== Buckycolumns ===
Buckydiscs with heights larger than 1 mm can be referred to as buckycolumns. These carbon nanotube monoliths often exhibit hyperboloid geometries and are highly compressible

=== Buckyprism ===
It is possible to use square housing to generate square cross sections, known as buckyprisms.

== See also ==
- Buckypaper
- Nanotechnology
- Carbon nanotube
- Graphene oxide paper
