= Flower structure =

Flower structure may refer to:

- Structure of a flower
- Flower structure (tectonics), structure of a fault resembling flower
- Nanoflower, flower-like structure of a chemical compound
