= Jim Zheng =

Jim Jian-Ping Zheng is an electrical engineer and professor with expertise in energy systems.

Zheng is a SUNY Empire Innovation Professor in the Department of Electrical Engineering at the University at Buffalo, Before moving to SUNY-Buffalo, he was the Sprint Eminent Scholar Chair in the Department of Electrical Engineering at Florida State University. and a researcher at the Army Research Laboratory.

A researcher on the design, manufacture and uses nanomaterials in the energy area, Zheng holds the patent on a buckypaper polymer fuel cell production technique that is licensed to Bing Energy.

Zheng was elected to the National Academy of Inventors in 2015. In 2024 he was named as a Fellow of the IEEE "for his contributions to energy storage technologies".
