= Carbon nanotube chemistry =

Area of research analysing the modification of carbon nanotubes

Carbon nanotube chemistry involves chemical reactions, which are used to modify the properties of carbon nanotubes (CNTs). CNTs can be functionalized to attain desired properties that can be used in a wide variety of applications. The two main methods of CNT functionalization are covalent and non-covalent modifications.

Because of their hydrophobic nature, CNTs tend to agglomerate hindering their dispersion in solvents or viscous polymer melts. The resulting nanotube bundles or aggregates reduce the mechanical performance of the final composite. The surface of CNTs can be modified to reduce the hydrophobicity and improve interfacial adhesion to a bulk polymer through chemical attachment.

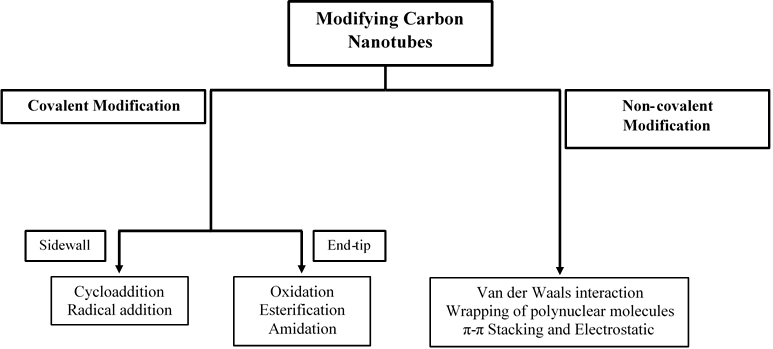
Chart summarizing options for the chemical modification of carbon nanotubes.

== Covalent modification ==
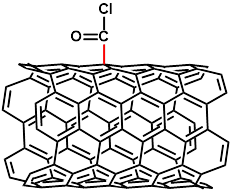
Covalent modification of carbon nanotubes.

Covalent modification attaches a functional group onto the carbon nanotube. The functional groups can be attached onto the side wall or ends of the carbon nanotube. The end caps of the carbon nanotubes have the highest reactivity due to its higher pyramidization angle and the walls of the carbon nanotubes have lower pyramidization angles which has lower reactivity. Although covalent modifications are very stable, the bonding process disrupts the sp^{2} hybridization of the carbon atoms because a σ-bond is formed. The disruption of the extended sp^{2} hybridization typically decreases the conductance of the carbon nanotubes.

=== Oxidation ===
The purification and oxidation of carbon nanotubes (CNTs) has been well represented in literature. These processes were essential for low yield production of carbon nanotubes where carbon particles, amorphous carbon particles and coatings comprised a significant percentage of the overall material and are still important for the introduction of surface functional groups. During acid oxidation, the carbon-carbon bonded network of the graphitic layers is broken allowing the introduction of oxygen units in the form of carboxyl, phenolic and lactone groups, which have been extensively exploited for further chemical functionalisation.

First studies on oxidation of carbon nanotubes involved a gas-phase reactions with nitric acid vapor in air, which indiscriminately functionalized the carbon nanotubes with carboxylic, carbonyl or hydroxyl groups. In liquid-phase reactions, carbon nanotubes were treated with oxidizing solutions of nitric acid or a combination of nitric and sulfuric acid to the same effect. However, overoxidation may occur causing the carbon nanotube to break up into fragments, which are known as carbonaceous fragments. Xing et al. revealed sonication assisted oxidation, with sulfuric and nitric acid, of carbon nanotubes and produced carbonyl and carboxyl groups. After the oxidation reaction in acidic solution, treatment with hydrogen peroxide limited the damage on the carbon nanotube network. Single-walled carbon nanotubes can be shortened in a scalable manner using oleum (100% H_{2}SO_{4} with 3% SO_{3}) and nitric acid. The nitric acid cuts carbon nanotubes while the oleum creates a channel.

In one type of chemical modification, aniline is oxidized to a diazonium intermediate. After expulsion of nitrogen, it forms a covalent bond as an aryl radical:

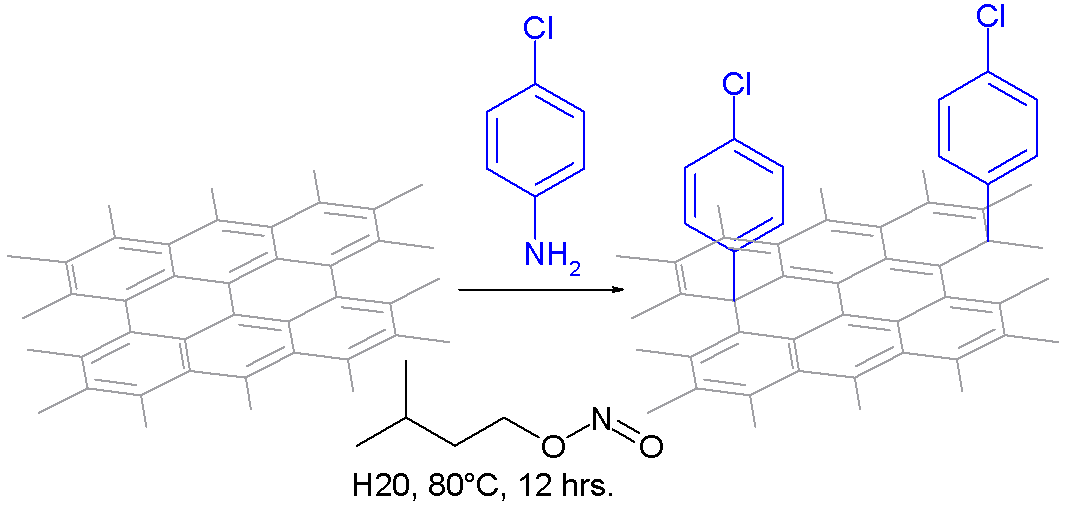
On Water Nanotube Functionalization

=== Esterification/Amidation ===
Carboxylic groups are used as the precursor for most esterification and amidation reactions. The carboxylic group is converted into an acyl chloride with the use of thionyl or oxalyl chloride which is then reacted with the desired amide, amine, or alcohol. Carbon nanotubes have been deposited on with silver nanoparticles with the aid of amination reactions. Amide functionalized carbon nanotubes have been shown to chelate silver nanoparticles. Carbon nanotubes modified with acyl chloride react readily with highly branched molecules such as poly(amidoamine), which acts as a template for silver ion and later being reduced by formaldehyde. Amino-modified carbon nanotubes can be prepared by reacting ethylenediamine with an acyl chloride functionalized carbon nanotubes.

=== Halogenation reactions ===
Carbon nanotubes can be treated with peroxytrifluoroacetic acid to give mainly carboxylic acid and trifluoroacetic functional groups. The fluorinated carbon nanotubes, through substitution, can be further functionalized with urea, guanidine, thiourea and aminosilane. Using the Hunsdiecker reaction, carbon nanotubes treated with nitric acid can react with iodosobenzenediacetate to iodate carbon nanotubes.

=== Cycloaddition ===
Also known are protocols for cycloadditions such as Diels-Alder reactions, 1,3-dipolar cycloadditions of azomethine ylides and azide–alkyne cycloaddition reactions. One example is a DA reaction assisted by chromium hexacarbonyl and high pressure. The I_{D}/I_{G} ratio for reaction with Danishefsky's diene is 2.6.

The most well-known 1,3 cycloaddition reaction involves azomethine ylides reacting with carbon nanotubes, which are of great interest. The addition of a pyrrolidine ring can lead to a variety of functional groups such as second-generation poly(amidoamine) dendrimers, phthalocyanine addends, perfluoroalkylsilane groups, and amino ethyleneglycol groups. The Diels-cycloaddition reaction can occur, especially on fluorinated carbon nanotubes. They are known to undergo Diels–Alder reactions with dienes such as 2,3-dimethyl-1,3-butadiene, anthracene, and 2-trimethylsiloxyl-1,3-butadiene.

=== Radical addition ===
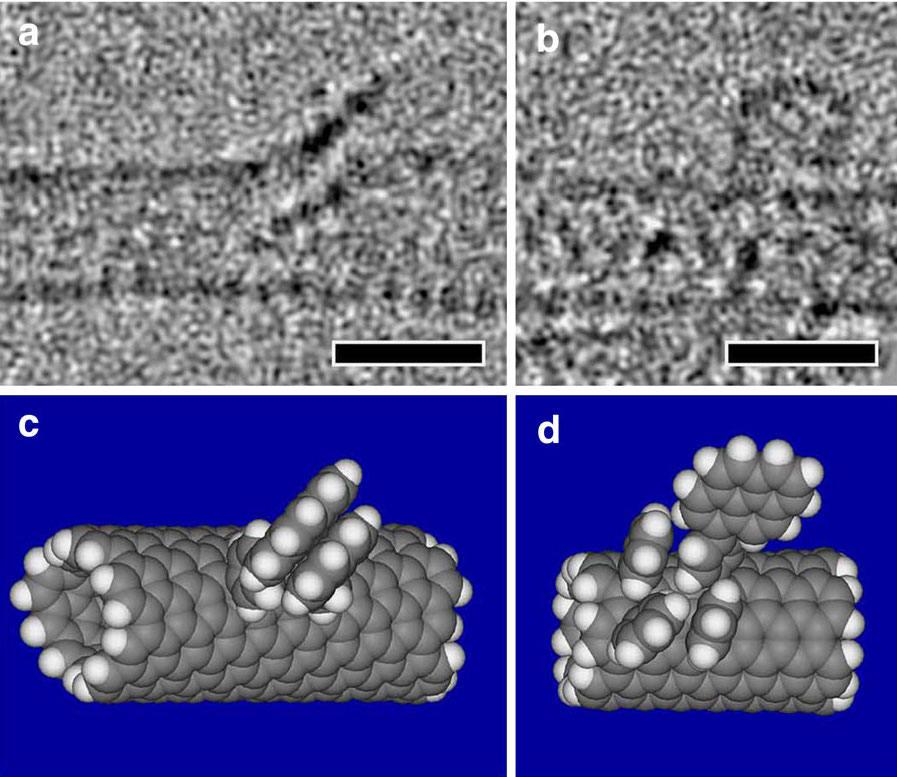
Top: electron micrographs showing interaction of CNTs with 4-(1-pyrenyl)phenyl radical (a) and its boronic ester (b). Bottom: corresponding models.

The modification of carbon nanotubes with aryl diazonium salts was studied first by Tour et al. Due to the harsh conditions needed for the in situ generated diazonium compound, other methods have been explored. Stephenson et al. reported using aniline derivatives with sodium nitrite in 96% sulfuric acid and ammonium persulfate. Price et al. demonstrated that stirring carbon nanotubes in water and treating with anilines and oxidizing agents proved to be a milder reaction. The diazonium chemistry functionalized carbon nanotubes which was used as a precursor to further modifications. Suzuki and Heck coupling reactions were performed on iodophenyl-functionalized carbon nanotubes. Wong et al. demonstrated mild photochemical reactions to silylate the carbon nanotubes with trimethoxysilane and hexaphenyldisilane.

=== Nucleophilic addition ===
Hirsch et al. conducted nucleophilic additions with organolithium and organomagnesium compounds onto carbon nanotubes. With further oxidation in air, they were able to create alkyl-modified carbon nanotubes. Hirsch was also able to show the nucleophilic addition of amines by generating lithium amides, leading to amino-modified carbon nanotubes.

=== Electrophilic addition ===
Nanotubes can also be alkylated with alkyl halides using lithium or sodium metal and liquid ammonia (Birch reduction conditions). The initial nanotube salt can function as a polymerization initiator and can react with peroxides to form alkoxy functionalized nanotubes

The alkyl and hydroxyl modification of carbon nanotubes was demonstrated with the electrophilic addition of alkyl halides by microwave irradiation. Tessonnier et al. modified carbon nanotubes with amino groups by deprotonating with butyl lithium and reacting with amino substitution. Balaban et al. applied Friedel-Crafts acylation to carbon nanotubes with nitrobenzene at 180 °C along with aluminum chloride.

== Non-covalent modifications ==
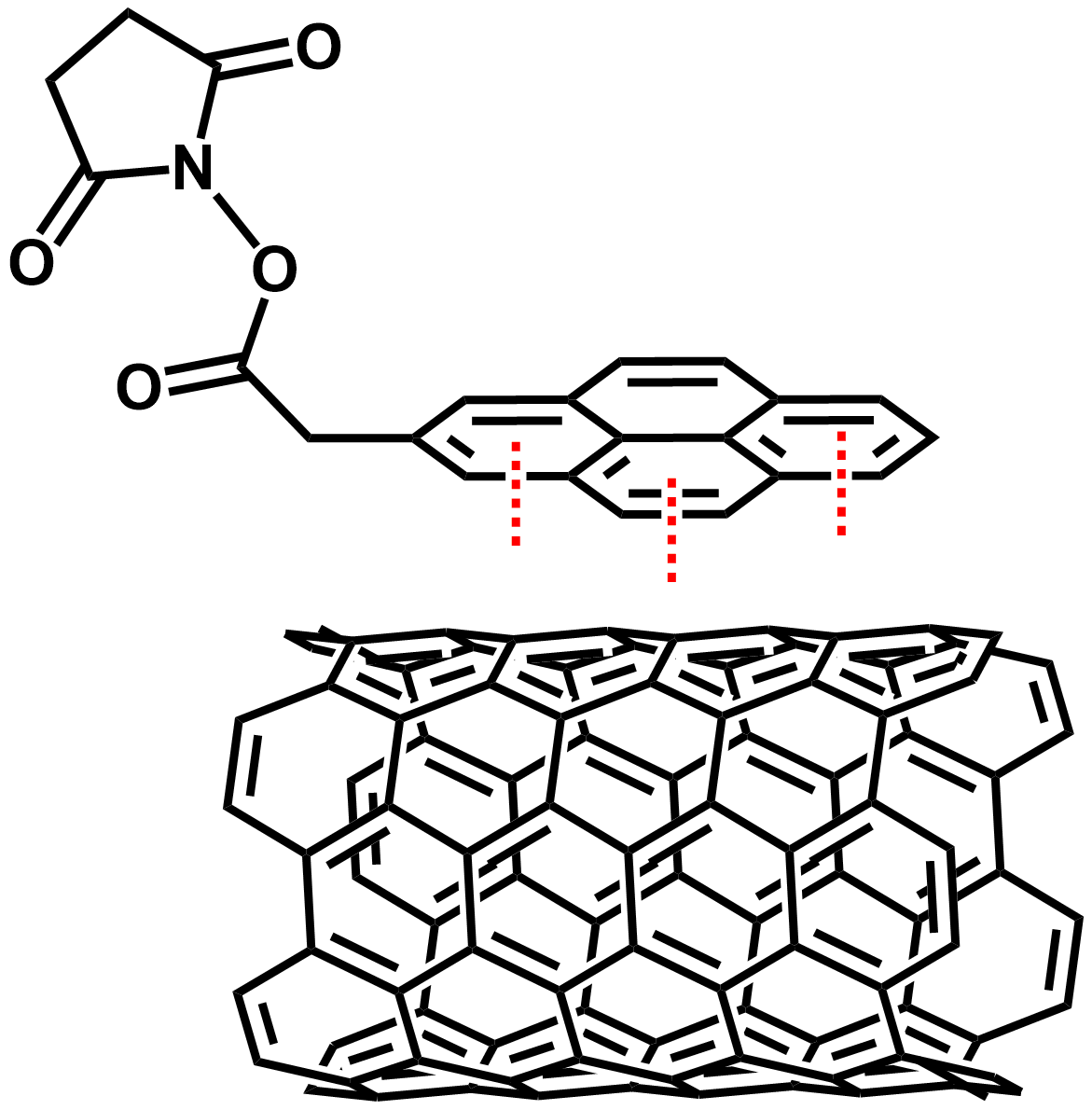
Non-covalent modification of carbon nanotubes.

Non-covalent modifications utilize van der Waals forces and π-π interactions by adsorption of polynuclear aromatic compounds, surfactants, polymers or biomolecules. Non-covalent modifications do not disrupt the natural configuration of carbon nanotubes with the cost of chemical stability, and is prone to phase separation, dissociation in between two phases, in the solid state.

=== Polynuclear aromatic compounds ===
Some common polynuclear aromatic compounds that are functionalized with hydrophilic or hydrophobic moieties are used to solubilize carbon nanotubes into organic or aqueous solvents. Some of these amphiphiles are phenyl, naphthalene, phenanthrene, pyrene and porphyrin systems. The greater π-π stacking of aromatic amphiphiles such as pyrene amphiphiles had the best solubility compared to phenyl amphiphiles with the worse π-π stacking, lead to more solubility in water. These aromatic systems can be modified with amino and carboxylic acid groups prior to functionalizing the carbon nanotubes.

=== Biomolecules ===
The interaction between carbon nanotubes and biomolecules has been widely studied because of their potential to be used in biological applications. The modification of the carbon nanotubes with proteins, carbohydrates, and nucleic acids are built with the bottom-up technique. Proteins have high affinity to carbon nanotubes due to their diversity of amino acids being hydrophobic or hydrophilic. Polysaccharides have been successfully been used to modify carbon nanotubes forming stable hybrids. To make carbon nanotubes soluble in water, phospholipids such as lysoglycerophospholipids have been used. The single phospholipid tail wraps around the carbon nanotube, but the double tailed phospholipids did not have the same ability.

=== π-π stacking and electrostatic interactions ===
Molecules that have bifunctionality are used to modify the carbon nanotube. One end of the molecule are polyaromatic compounds that interact with the carbon nanotube through π-π stacking. The other end of the same molecule has a functional group such as amino, carboxyl, or thiol. For example, pyrene derivatives and aryl thiols were used as the linkers for various metal nanobeads such as gold, silver and platinum.

=== Mechanical interlocking ===
A particular case of non-covalent modification is the formation of rotaxane-like mechanically interlocked derivatives of single-walled nanotubes (SWNTs). In this strategy, the SWNTs are encapsulated by molecular macrocycle(s), which are either formed around them by macrocyclization, or pre-formed and threaded at a later stage. In MINTs (Mechanically Interlocked NanoTubes), the SWNT and organic macrocycle are linked by means of their topology, through a mechanical bond, combining the stability of the covalent strategies -at least one covalent bond must be broken to separate SWNT and macrocycle(s)- with the structural integrity of the classic noncovalent strategies -the C-sp^{2} network of the SWNT remains intact.

== Characterization ==
A useful tool for the analysis of derivatised nanotubes is Raman spectroscopy which shows a G-band (G for graphite) for the native nanotubes at 1580 cm^{−1} and a D-band (D for defect) at 1350 cm^{−1} when the graphite lattice is disrupted with conversion of sp² to sp³ hybridized carbon. The ratio of both peaks I_{D}/I_{G} is taken as a measure of functionalization. Other tools are UV spectroscopy where pristine nanotubes show distinct Van Hove singularities where functionalized tubes do not, and simple TGA analysis.

== See also ==
- Selective chemistry of single-walled nanotubes
