= Nanoflower =

Compound that results in formations which in microscopic view resemble flowers

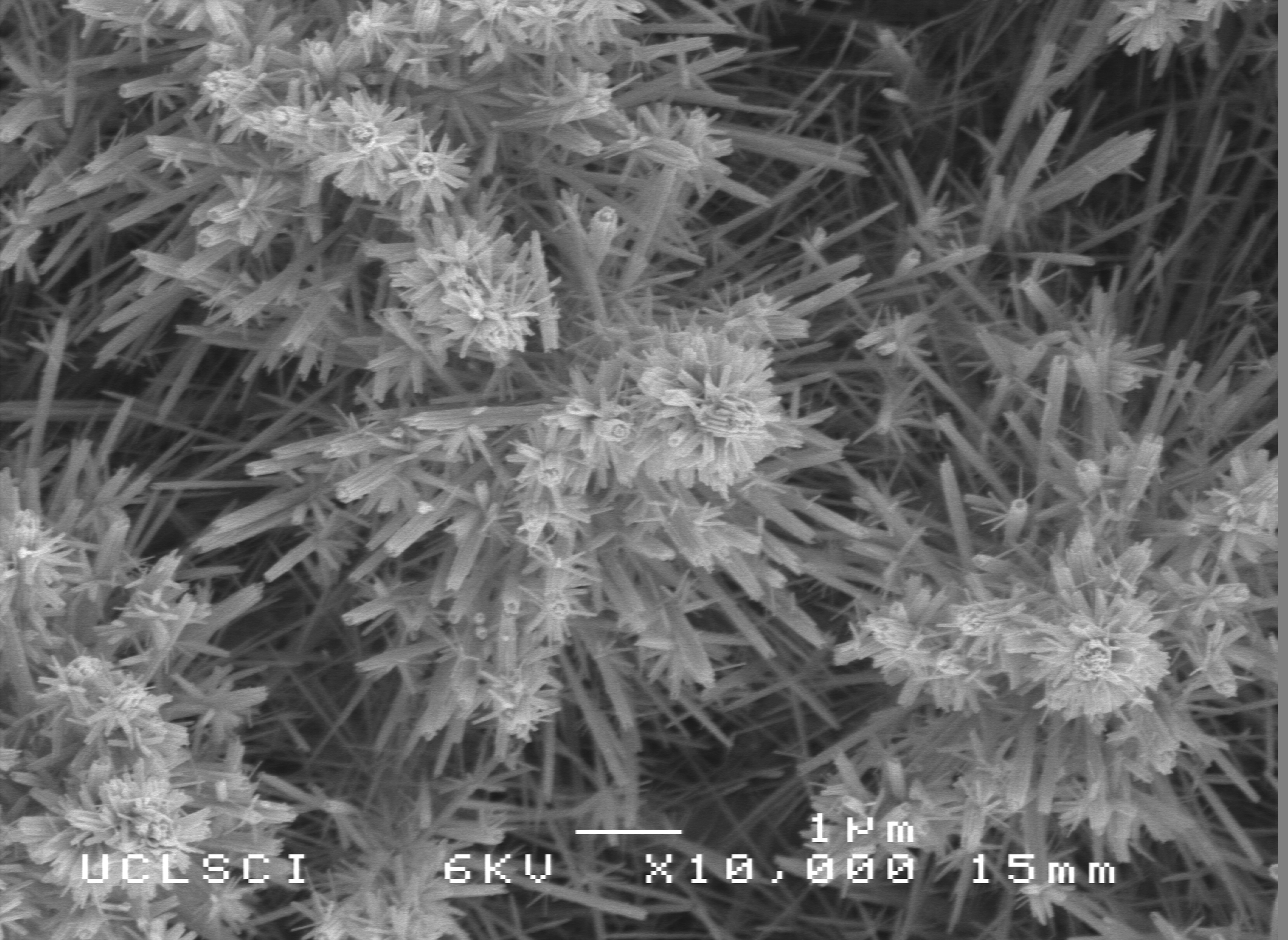
Catalytic nanomaterial with a flower-shaped structure

A nanoflower, in chemistry, refers to a compound of certain elements that results in formations which in microscopic view resemble flowers or, in some cases, trees that are called nanobouquets or nanotrees. These formations are nanometers long and thick so they can only be observed using electron microscopy.

== Production ==
Several ways to produce nanoflowers are known:

- A process similar to the making of a carbon nanotube using a hydrocarbon gas.
- Heating gallium (Ga) and then flowing methane (CH_{4}) over, under specific pressure and heat. This forms flower-shaped silicon carbide (SiC) structures.
- Heating a molybdenum dioxide (MoO_{2}) thin film on a piece of molybdenum foil surrounded by sulfur vapour.

== Nanomeadow ==
In supercapacitors, energy is stored because the electrodes are coated with a porous material that soaks up ions like a sponge, usually activated carbon. Nanomeadow supercapacitors store ions in manganese oxide (MnO), a material with a much greater capacity for ions than activated carbon.

Scientists at Research Institute of Chemical Defence (Beijing, China) and Peking University created a nanomeadow of microscopic structures, fuzzy flowers of MnO each about 100 nanometres across on a field of messy carbon nanotube grass grown on a tantalum metal foil. Nanomeadows perform 10 times better than MnO alone and can store twice as much charge as the carbon-based electrodes in existing ultracapacitors.

== See also ==
- Carbon nanotubes in photovoltaics
- Carbon nanotube – Allotropes of carbon with a cylindrical nanostructure
- Selective chemistry of single-walled nanotubes
- Resonance Raman spectroscopy – Raman spectroscopy technique
- Allotropes of carbon – Materials made only out of carbon
- graphene – Hexagonal lattice made of carbon atoms
- buckypaper – Thin sheet made of aggregated carbon nanotubes
- Electric double-layer capacitor – High-capacity electrochemical capacitor
- Hiromichi Kataura – Japanese scientist
