= Trimethoxysilane =

Organosilicon compound

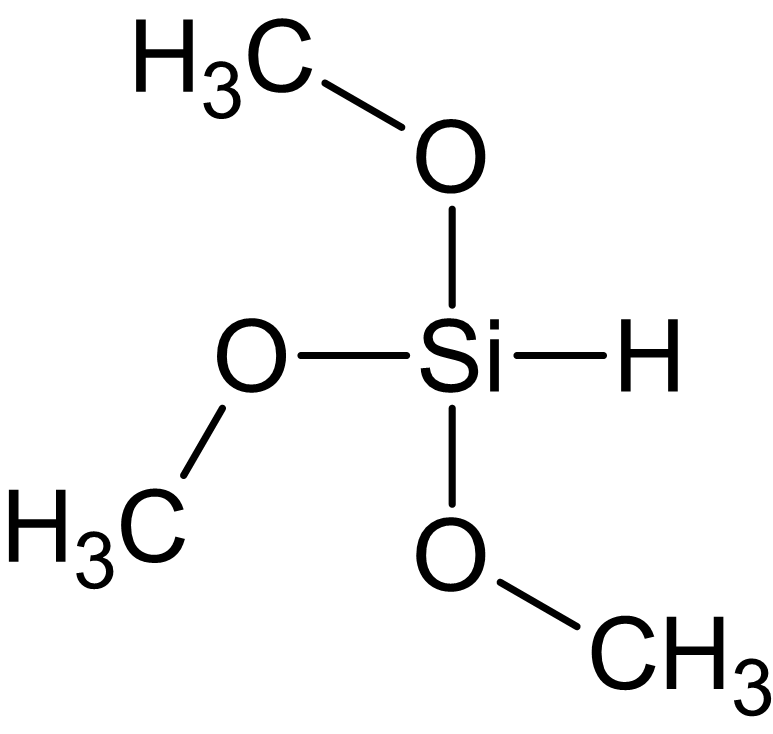

Names
- IUPAC name Trimethoxysilane
- Other names Trimethoxy silane

Identifiers
CAS Number	2487-90-3
3D model (JSmol)	Interactive image
ChemSpider	16295
ECHA InfoCard	100.017.853
EC Number	219-637-2
PubChem CID	6327428
UNII	V1J39XPF91
UN number	9269
CompTox Dashboard (EPA)	DTXSID0027482
- InChI: InChI=1S/C3H10O3Si/c1-4-7(5-2)6-3/h1-3H3 Key: PZJJKWKADRNWSW-UHFFFAOYSA-N
- SMILES: CO[Si](OC)OC

Properties
Chemical formula	C_{3}H_{10}O_{3}Si
Molar mass	122.195 g·mol^{−1}
Appearance	Clear colorless liquid
Density	0.86 g/mL; Vapor density >1 (vs air)
Melting point	−115 °C (−175 °F; 158 K)
Boiling point	84 °C (183 °F; 357 K)
Solubility in water	Slightly soluble
Vapor pressure	< 7.2 mmHg (20 °C)

Hazards
- Occupational safety and health (OHS/OSH)
Main hazards	Poison inhalation and flammable
- GHS labelling
Pictograms	(GHS02: Flammable) (GHS06: Toxic)
NFPA 704 (fire diamond)	4 3 2
- Lethal dose or concentration (LD, LC)
LD_{50} (median dose)	1560 uL/kg (rat, oral); 42 ppm/4H (rat, inhalation); 6300 uL/kg (rabbit, skin)
- Except where otherwise noted, data are given for materials in their standard state (at 25 °C [77 °F], 100 kPa). Infobox references

Trimethoxysilane (TMS) is an organosilicon compound with the formula HSi(OCH_{3})_{3}. The compound is a commonly used basic raw material for the preparation of silicone materials.

== Synthesis ==
There are multiple synthesis methods of trimethoxysilane, which includes the direct synthesis of trialkoxysilane. The direct synthesis is a reaction of silicon and alcohol. This reaction takes place in a solvent with the presence of a catalytically effective amount of direct synthesis catalyst and an effective catalyst-promoting amount of direct synthesis catalyst promoter. This promoter is often an organic or inorganic compound possessing at least one phosphorus-oxygen bond.

Trimethoxysilane can be produced in a complicated synthesis. This synthesis includes steps such as, using a wet chemical reduction method to prepare nano-copper. Then preparing a silicon powder-nano-copper catalyst mixture, which is followed by preparing trimethoxysilane by a fixed bed reactor. This trimethoxysilane synthesis is suitable for industrialized production as the synthesis is simple and convenient to operate.

== Reactions and use ==
Trimethoxysilane is an important substance for producing silane coupling agents. It contains both hydrolyzable siloxane bonds as well as an active silicon-hydrogen bond. Thereby it can be utilized in a series of reactions, such as copolymerization, polycondensation, and disproportionation reactions. These reactions have many possible downstream products which are used to manufacture diverse coupling agents, silylating substances for plastic surfaces, and reagents for thermal insulation production.

The plastic industry makes use of certain organic coupling agents, like adhesion promoters, which can thus be manufactured from trimethoxysilane. An example is trimethoxysilylpropyl methacrylate, which is produced by direct addition of trimethoxy silane to the 3-methacryloxypropyl group in the presence of radical scavengers. The resulting compound plays an important role in organosiloxane copolymers, prosthetics, and contact lenses. Besides that it can also work as coupling or silylating agent in other reactions.

A silane coupling agent acts as a sort of intermediary which bonds organic materials to inorganic materials. It is this characteristic that makes silane coupling agents useful for improving the mechanical strength of composite materials, for improving adhesion, and for resin and surface modification.

TMS is used as an adhesive and binding agent (92%), as an intermediate (7%) and as a surface active agent (1%). Due to its high reactivity, trimethoxysilane is produced and used as site-limited intermediate in closed systems. This limits the potential for exposure.

== Toxicity and adverse effects ==
=== Exposure and symptoms ===
Trimethoxysilane is a dermatotoxin. Exposure can occur via inhalation or skin or eye contact. In case of inhalation of trimethoxysilane, a typical effect is respiratory tract irritation, which can be fatal. Toxic vapors can cause inflammation of the lungs and even pneumonitis. The patient can be treated by clearing the airways and administering an oxygen mask. When vapors come in contact with the eyes, this can cause irritation or even blindness when it is absorbed into the corneal tissues. In case of eye contamination, immediately flushing with water is desired. TMS can also be absorbed via skin, causing skin irritation. This can be treated by rinsing with flowing water as well. High exposure to TMS may cause other physical problems like headache, drowsiness and seizure, which eventually can be fatal.

=== Animal testing ===
The effects of trimethoxysilane were also tested on rats. Exposure to the rats eyes had the same effect as in humans. It causes eye irritation and damage of the cornea and conjunctiva. The efficacy of trimethoxy was tested on rats and rabbits. When administered orally in rats, the median lethal dose (LD_{50}) is estimated to be 1560 μL/kg. The lethal dose or lethal concentration is the amount of chemical at which 50% of the test group of animals dies. Via inhalation, the lethal concentration (LC_{50}) is 42 ppm/4h. Finally, the LD_{50} in rabbits is 6300 μL/kg when administered via the skin.

== Metabolism ==
=== Metabolism in the environment ===
Trimethoxysilane has a relatively high vapor pressure of 76 Hg at 25 °C which means that it is solely present in the gas phase in the atmosphere. It can either be hydrolyzed immediately, or degraded via reaction with hydroxyl radicals in the air. The half-life for the latter reaction is calculated to be 6.4 days. TMS itself is not expected to be susceptible to direct photolysis by sunlight. If TMS is hydrolyzed in air, this occurs within 3 minutes at 25 °C, which is much faster. Hydrolysis of TMS can also occur in water, but at a 10 times slower rate than in air: 0.3 minutes at 2 °C. Hydrolysis of TMS produces methanol and silanetriol at a ratio of 3:1. The produced silane triol can undergo further condensation, which results in either siloxane polymers or monomers depending on the concentration.
