= Tetraoctylammonium bromide =

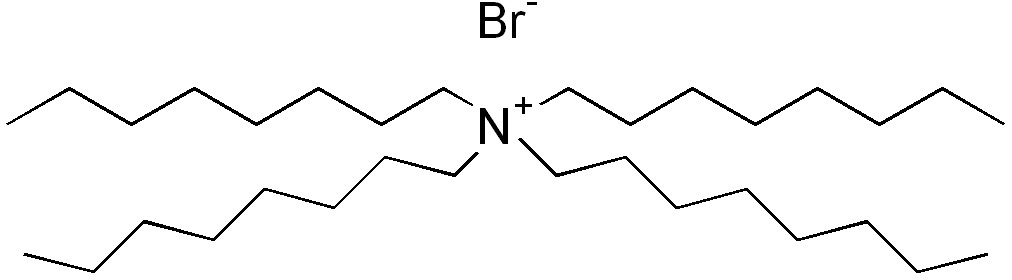

Names
- Preferred IUPAC name N,N,N-Tri(octyl)octan-1-aminium bromide

Identifiers
| CAS Number | 14866-33-2 |
| 3D model (JSmol) | Interactive image |
| ChemSpider | 2015873 |
| ECHA InfoCard | 100.035.382 |
| EC Number | 238-936-9 |
| PubChem CID | 2734117 |
| UNII | 52QW29OWOC |
| CompTox Dashboard (EPA) | DTXSID7034042 |
- InChI: InChI=1S/C32H68N.BrH/c1-5-9-13-17-21-25-29-33(30-26-22-18-14-10-6-2,31-27-23-19-15-11-7-3)32-28-24-20-16-12-8-4;/h5-32H2,1-4H3;1H/q+1;/p-1 Key: QBVXKDJEZKEASM-UHFFFAOYSA-M; InChI=1/C32H68N.BrH/c1-5-9-13-17-21-25-29-33(30-26-22-18-14-10-6-2,31-27-23-19-15-11-7-3)32-28-24-20-16-12-8-4;/h5-32H2,1-4H3;1H/q+1;/p-1 Key: QBVXKDJEZKEASM-REWHXWOFAV
- SMILES: CCCCCCCC[N+](CCCCCCCC)(CCCCCCCC)CCCCCCCC.[Br-]

Properties
| Chemical formula | C_{32}H_{68}BrN |
| Molar mass | 546.79 |
| Melting point | 95 to 98 °C (203 to 208 °F; 368 to 371 K) |
- Except where otherwise noted, data are given for materials in their standard state (at 25 °C [77 °F], 100 kPa). verify (what is ?) Infobox references

Tetraoctylammonium bromide (TOAB or TOABr) is a quaternary ammonium compound with the chemical formula: [CH_{3}(CH_{2})_{7}]_{4}N Br. It is generally used as a phase transfer catalyst between an aqueous solution and an organic solution.
