= Graphene oxide paper =

Graphene oxide paper or graphite oxide paper is a material fabricated from graphite oxide. Micrometer thick films of graphene oxide paper are also named as graphite oxide membranes (in the 1960s) or (more recently) graphene oxide membranes. The membranes are typically obtained by slow evaporation of graphene oxide solution or by the filtration method.

The material has exceptional stiffness and strength, due to the intrinsic strength of the two-dimensional graphene backbone and to its interwoven layer structure which distributes loads.

== Preparation ==
The starting material is water-dispersed graphene oxide flakes. The aqueous dispersion is vacuum filtrated to produce free standing foils. The thickness of these foils is typically in the range of 0.1-50 micrometers. Depending on application the graphene oxide laminates are named either as papers or as membranes. Alternative methods to prepare free standing graphene oxide multilayers/laminates is to use repeated drop casting or spin coating. These flakes may be chemically bonded, leading to the development of additional new materials. Like the starting material, graphene oxide paper is an electrical insulator; however, it may be possible to tune this property, making the paper a conductor or semiconductor, without sacrificing its mechanical properties.

== Properties ==
Detailed studies of graphite oxide paper by V. Kohlschütter and P. Haenni date back to 1918. Studies of graphite oxide membranes were performed by Hanns-Peter Boehm, the German scientist who invented the term "graphene", in 1960. The paper titled "Graphite Oxide and its membrane properties" reported synthesis of "paper-like foils" with 0.05 mm thickness. The membranes were reported to be not permeable by gases (nitrogen and oxygen) but easily permeable by water vapors and, suggestively, by any other solvents which are able to intercalate graphite oxide. It was also reported that the membranes are not permeable by "substances of lower molecular weight".

Permeation of water through the membrane was attributed to swelling of graphite oxide structure which enables water penetration path between individual graphene oxide layers. The interlayer distance of dried graphite oxide was reported as 6.35 Å, but in liquid water it increased to 11.6 Å. Remarkably, the paper also cited the inter-layer distance in diluted NaOH as infinity thus reporting dispersion of graphite oxide on single-layered graphene oxide sheets in solution. The study also reported permeation rate of membranes for water 0.1 mg per minute per square cm. The diffusion rate of water was evaluated as 1 cm/hour. Boehm's paper also showed that graphite oxide can be used as cation exchange membrane and reports measurements of osmotic pressures, membrane potentials in KCl, HCl, CaCl_{2}, MgCl_{2}, BaCl_{2} solutions. The membranes were also reported to be permeable by large alkaloid ions as they are able to penetrate between graphene oxide layers.

In 2012 some of the properties of graphite oxide membranes discovered by Boehm were re-discovered: the membranes were reported to be not permeable by helium but permeable by water vapors. This study was later expanded to demonstrate that several salts (for example KCl, MgCl_{2}) diffuse through the graphene oxide membrane if it is immersed in water solution.

Graphene oxide membranes are actively being studied for their applications to water desalination. Retention rates over 90% were reported in a 1960 study for NaCl solutions using stabilized graphene oxide membranes in reverse osmosis setup.

== See also ==
- Nanotechnology
- Buckypaper
- Carbon nanotube
- Graphene oxide
