= Hiromichi Kataura =

Japanese scientist (born 1959)

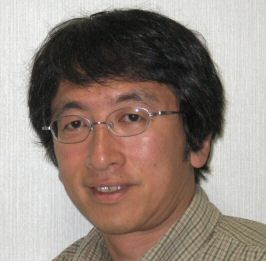
- Born: 1959 (age 66–67); Oyama, Tochigi Prefecture
- Known for: Carbon nanotubes
- Scientific career
- Fields: Nanotechnology

Hiromichi Kataura (片浦 弘道, Kataura Hiromichi) is a Japanese scientist known for his work on synthesis and characterization of single-wall and double-wall carbon nanotubes and on encapsulation of water, fullerenes and other organic molecules into carbon nanotubes.

Kataura is the leader of self-assembled nano-electronics group at the National Institute of Advanced Industrial Science and Technology (AIST).

== Kataura plot ==
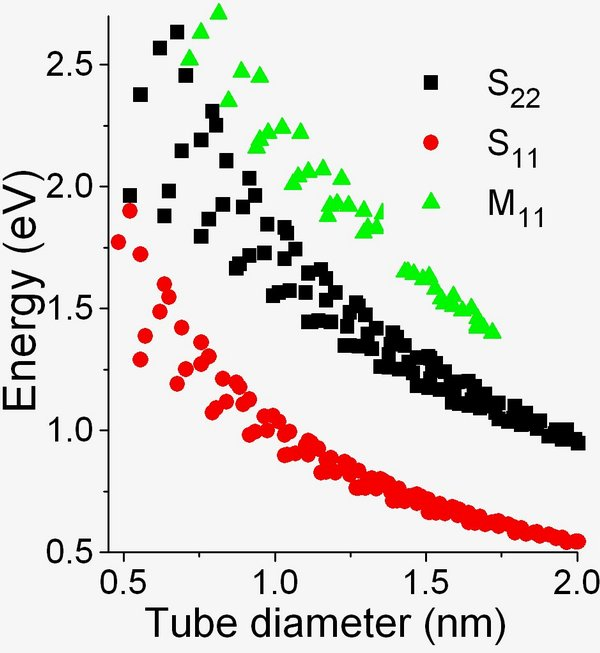
Kataura plot

Kataura plot is a graph relating the energy of the band gaps in a carbon nanotube and its diameter. A nanotube of certain diameter can be metallic M or semiconducting S; it can have several band gaps, conventionally labeled as S_{11}, S_{22}, M_{11}, M_{22}, etc. This property results in multiple branches in the Kataura plot.

The original article on the Kataura plot has been reported in a lesser-known journal Synthetic Metals. Nevertheless, this article has been cited more than 1900 times in peer-reviewed scientific journals between 2000 and January 2020.
