= Selective chemistry of single-walled nanotubes =

Selective chemistry of single-walled nanotubes is a field in Carbon nanotube chemistry devoted specifically to the study of functionalization of single-walled carbon nanotubes.

== Structure and reactivity ==
Reactivity of fullerene molecules with respect to addition chemistries is strongly dependent on the curvature of the carbon framework. Their outer surface (exohedral) reactivity increases with increase in curvature. In comparison with fullerene molecules single-walled nanotubes (SWNTs) are moderately curved. Consequently, nanotubes are expected to be less reactive than most fullerene molecules due to their smaller curvature, but more reactive than a graphene sheet due to pyramidalization and misalignment of pi-orbitals. The strain of a carbon framework is also reflected in the pyramidalization angle (Ө_{p}) of the carbon constituents. Trigonal carbon atoms (sp^{2} hybridized) prefer a planar orientation with Ө_{p}=0° (i.e. graphene) and fullerene molecules have Ө_{p}= 11.6°. The (5,5) SWNT has Ө_{p}~6° for the sidewall. Values for other (n,n) nanotubes show a trend of increasing Ө_{p} (sidewall) with decrease in n. Therefore, generally the chemical reactivity of SWNT increases with decrease in diameter (or n, diameter increases with n). Apart from the curvature SWNT reactivity is also highly sensitive to chiral wrapping (n,m) which determine its electronic structure. Nanotubes with n - m = 3i (i is an integer) are all metals and rest are all semiconducting (SC).

== Sidewall functionalization ==
Carbon nanotubes are metallic or semiconducting, based upon delocalized electrons occupying a 1-D density of states. However, any covalent bond on SWNT sidewall causes localization of these electrons. In the vicinity of localized electrons, the SWNT can no longer be described using a band model that assumes delocalized electrons moving in a periodic potential.

Two important addition reactions of SWNT sidewall are: (1) Fluorination, and (2) Aryl diazonium salt addition. These functional groups on SWNT improve solubility and processibility. Moreover, these reactions allow for combining unique properties of SWNTs with those of other compounds. Above all, the selective diazonium chemistry can be used to separate the semiconducting and metallic nanotubes.

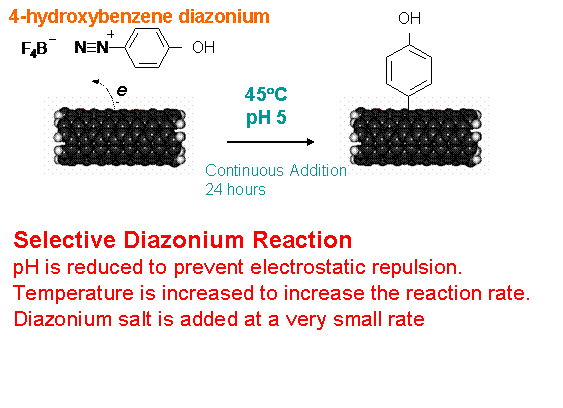

=== Fluorination ===
The first extensive SWNT sidewall reaction was fluorination in 1998 by Mickleson et al. These fluorine moieties can be removed from the nanotube by treatment in hydrazine and the spectroscopic properties of the SWNT can be restored completely.

=== Diazonium chemistry ===
One of the most important SWNT sidewall reaction is that with diazonium reagent which if done under controlled conditions can be used to do selective covalent chemistry.

Water-soluble diazonium salts react with carbon nanotubes via charge transfer in which they extract electrons from SWNT and form a stable covalent aryl bond. This covalent aryl bond forms with extremely high affinity for electrons with energies near the Fermi level, E_{f} of the nanotube. Metallic SWNT have a greater electron density near E_{f} resulting in their higher reactivity over semiconducting nanotubes. The reactant forms a charge-transfer complex at the nanotube surface, where electron donation from the latter stabilizes the transition state and accelerates the forward rate. Once the bond symmetry of the nanotube is disrupted by the formation of this defect, adjacent carbons increase in reactivity and initial selectivity for metallic SWNT is amplified. Under carefully controlled conditions this behavior can be exploited to obtain highly selective functionalization of metallic nanotubes to the near exclusion of the semiconductors.

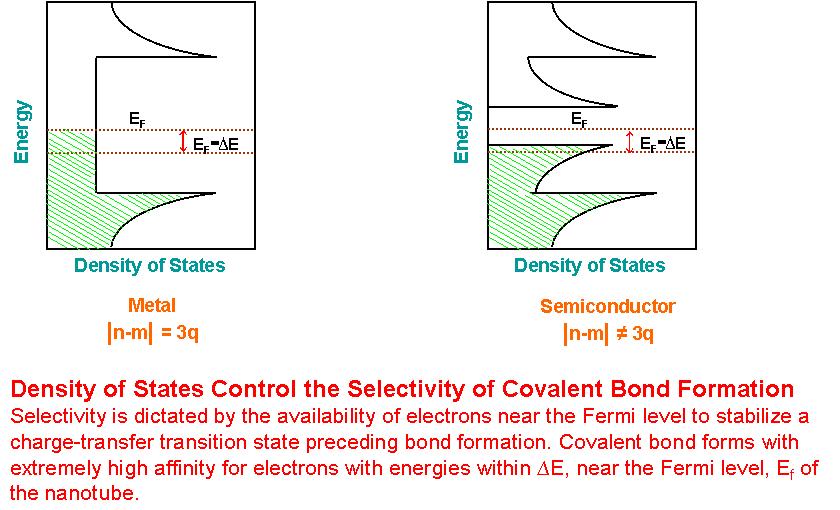

=== Selective reaction conditions ===
Primary condition is addition of reactant molecules at a very small rate to SWNT solution for a sufficient long time. This ensures reaction with only metallic SWNTs and with no semiconducting SWNTs as all the reactant molecules are taken up by the metallic SWNTs. Long time injection ensures that all metallic tubes are reacted. For example, one highly selective condition is: addition of 500 μL of 4-hydroxybenzene diazonium tetrafluoroborate solution in water (0.245 mM) at an injection rate of 20.83 μL/h into 5 mL of SWNT solution (1 wt % sodium dodecyl sulfate (SDS)) over 24 hrs. However, if the entire diazonium solution is added all instantaneously then semiconducting SWNTs will also react due to presence of excess reactant.

== Spectroscopy and functionalization ==
SWNTs have unique optical and spectroscopic properties largely due to one-dimensional confinement of electronic and phonon states, resulting in so-called van Hove singularities in the nanotube density of states (DOS).

=== Probing selective chemistry via optical absorption ===
Optical absorption monitors the valence (v) to conduction (c) electronic transitions denoted E_{nn} where n is the band index. The E_{11} transitions for the metallic nanotubes occur from ~440 to 645 nm. The E_{11} and E_{22} transitions for the semiconducting nanotubes are found from 830 to 1600 nm and 600 to 800 nm, respectively. These separated absorption features allow for the monitoring of valence electrons in each distinct nanotube. Reaction at the surface result in localization of valence electrons makes them no longer free to participate in photoabsorption which results in decay of the spectrum features.

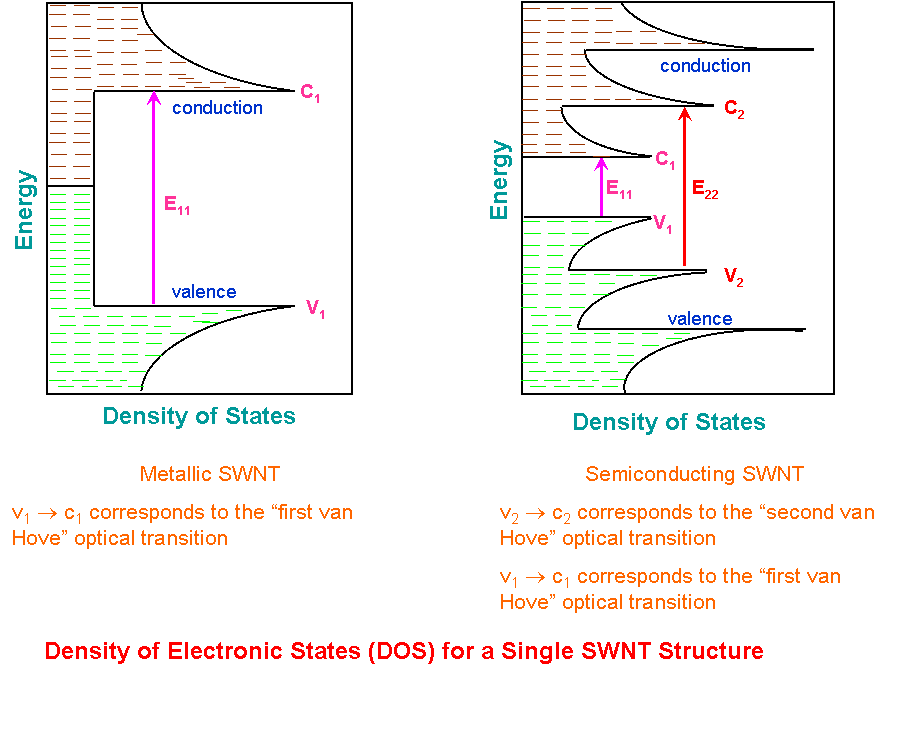

Selective diazonium chemistry abruptly decreases the peak intensities that represent the first Van Hove transition of metallic species (E_{11}, metal), while the peak intensities representing the second (E_{22}, semiconducting) and first (E_{11}, semiconducting) Van Hove transition of the semiconducting species show little or no change. A relative decrease in metallic SWNT absorption features over semiconducting features represents a highly preferential functionalization of the metallic nanotubes.

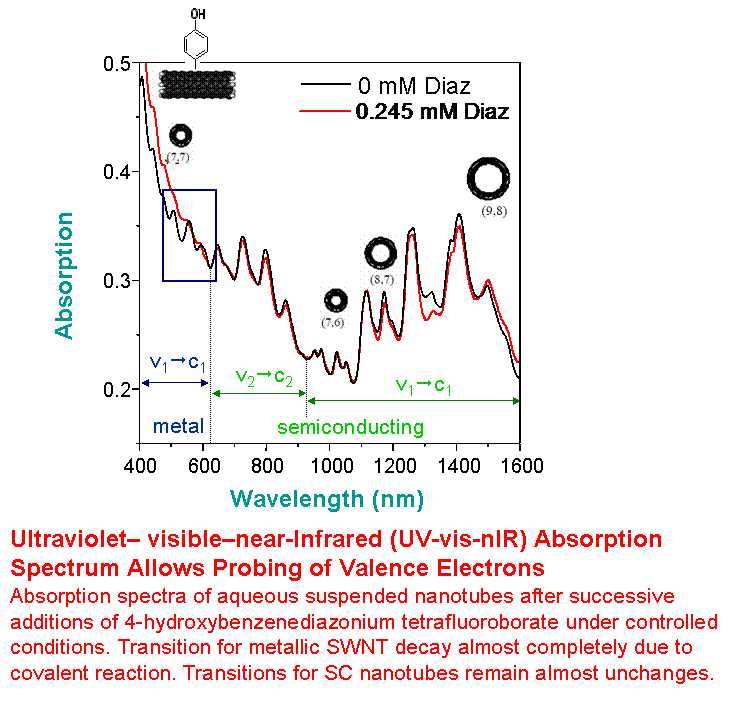

=== Raman spectroscopy ===
Raman spectroscopy is a powerful technique with wide-ranging applications in carbon nanotube studies. Some important Raman features are radial breathing mode (RBM), tangential mode (G-band), and disorder-related mode.

RBM features correspond to the coherent vibration of the C atoms in the radial direction of the nanotube. These features are unique in carbon nanotubes and occur with the frequencies ω_{RBM} between 120 and 350 cm^{−1} for SWNT in the diameter range (0.7 nm-2 nm). They can be used to probe the SWNT diameter, electronic structure through their frequency and intensity (I_{RBM}) respectively and hence perform an (n,m) assignment to their peaks. The addition of the moiety to the sidewall of the nanotube disrupts the oscillator strength that gives rise to RBM feature and hence causes decay of these features. These features are distinct for species of a particular nanotube (n,m) and hence enables to probe which SWNTs are functionalized and to what extent.

Two main components of the tangential mode include G^{+} at 1590 cm^{−1} and G^{−} at 1570 cm^{−1}. G^{+} feature is associated with carbon atom vibrations along the nanotube axis. The G^{−} feature is associated with vibrations of carbon atoms along the circumferential direction. The G-band frequency can be used (1) to distinguish between metallic and semiconducting SWNTs, and (2) to probe charge transfer arising from doping a SWNT. Frequency of G^{+} is sensitive to charge transfer. It upshifts for acceptors and downshifts for donors. Lineshape of G^{−} is highly sensitive to whether SWNT is metallic (Breit-Wigner-Fano lineshape) or semiconducting (Lorentzian lineshape).

The disorder-related mode (D peak) is a phonon mode at 1300 cm^{−1} and involves the resonantly enhanced scattering of an electron via phonon emission by a defect that breaks the basic symmetry of the graphene plane. This mode corresponds to the conversion of a sp^{2}-hybridized carbon to a sp^{3}-hybridized on the surface. Intensity of D peak measures covalent bond made with the nanotube surface. This feature does not increase as a result of surfactant or hydronium ion adsorption on the nanotube surface.

=== Selective reaction and Raman features ===
Selective functionalization increases the intensity of the D peak due to formation of aryl-nanotube bond and decreases the tangential mode due loss of electronic resonance. These two effects are generally summed together as increase in their peaks ratio (D/G). RBM peaks of metallic nanotubes decay and the peaks corresponding to those of semiconducting nanotubes remain almost unchanged.

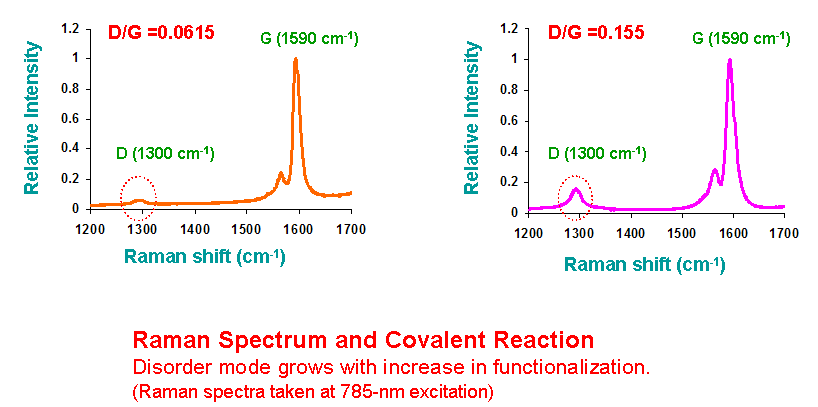

== Reaction mechanism ==
Diazonium reagent and SWNT reaction has a two step mechanism. First, the diazonium reagent adsorbs noncovalently to an empty site on the nanotube surface, forming a charge-transfer complex. This is a fast, selective noncovalent adsorption and diazonium group in this complex partially dopes the nanotube, diminishing the tangential mode in the Raman spectrum. Desorption of A from nanotube is negligible (k_{−1} ~ 0). In second step complex B then decomposes to form a covalent bond with the nanotube surface. This is a slower step that need not be selective and is represented by the restoration of the G peak and increase in the D band.

== Reversibility of diazonium chemistry ==
Nanotubes reacted with the diazonium reagent can be converted back into pristine nanotubes when thermally treated at 300 °C in an atmosphere of inert gas. This cleaves the aryl hydroxyl moieties from the nanotube sidewall and restores the spectroscopic feature (Raman and absorption spectra) of pristine nanotube.

== Chemical separation of metallic and semiconducting SWNTs ==
Metallic and semiconducting carbon nanotubes generally coexist in as-grown materials. To get only semiconducting or only metallic nanotubes selective functionalization of metallic SWNTs via 4-hydroxybenzene diazonium can be used. Separation can be done in solution by deprotonation of the p-hydroxybenzene group on the reacted nanotubes (metallic) in alkaline solution followed by electrophoretic separation of these charged species from the neutral species (semiconducting nanotubes). This followed by annealing would give separated pristine semiconducting and metallic SWNT.
