= Buckypaper =

Thin sheet made of aggregated carbon nanotubes

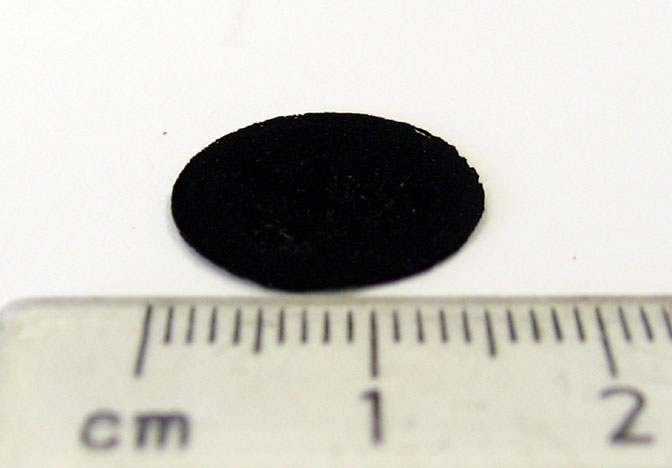
Buckypaper made of carbon nanotubes

Buckypaper is a thin sheet made from an aggregate of carbon nanotubes or carbon nanotube grid paper. The nanotubes are approximately 50,000 times thinner than a human hair. Originally, it was fabricated as a way to handle carbon nanotubes, but it is also being studied and developed into applications by several research groups, showing promise as vehicle armor, personal armor, and next-generation electronics and displays.

== Background ==
Buckypaper is a macroscopic aggregate of carbon nanotubes (CNT), or "buckytubes". It owes its name to the buckminsterfullerene, the 60 carbon fullerene (an allotrope of carbon with similar bonding that is sometimes referred to as a "Buckyball" in honor of R. Buckminster Fuller).

== Synthesis ==
The generally accepted methods of making CNT films involves the use of surfactants, such as Triton X-100 and sodium lauryl sulfate, which improves their dispersibility in aqueous solution. These suspensions can then be membrane filtered under positive or negative pressure to yield uniform films. The van der Waals force's interaction between the nanotube surface and the surfactant can often be mechanically strong and quite stable and therefore there are no assurances that all the surfactant is removed from the CNT film after formation. Washing with methanol, an effective solvent in the removal of Triton X, was found to cause cracking and deformation of the film. It has also been found that Triton X can lead to cell lysis and in turn tissue inflammatory responses even at low concentrations.

In order to avoid adverse side-effects from the possible presence of surfactants, an alternative casting process can be used involving a frit compression method that did not require the use of surfactants or surface modification. The dimensions can be controlled through the size of the syringe housing and through the mass of carbon nanotubes added. Their thicknesses are typically much larger than surfactant-cast buckypaper and have been synthesized from 120 μm up to 650 μm; whilst no nomenclature system exists to govern thicknesses for samples to be classified as paper, samples with thicknesses greater than 500 μm are referred to as buckydiscs. The frit compression method allows rapid casting of buckypaper and buckydiscs with recovery of the casting solvent and control over the 2D and 3D geometry.

Aligned multi-walled carbon nanotube (MWNT) growth has been used in CNT film synthesis through the domino effect. In this process, "forests" of MWNTs are pushed flat in a single direction, compressing their vertical orientation into the horizontal plane, which results in the formation of high-purity buckypaper with no further purification or treatment required. By comparison, when a buckypaper sample was formed from the 1 ton compression of chemical vapor deposition (CVD) generated MWNT powder, any application of a solvent led to the immediate swelling of the film till it reverted into particulate matter. It appears that for the CNT powder used, compression alone was insufficient to generate robust buckypaper and highlights that the aligned growth methodology generates in situ tube-tube interactions not found in CVD CNT powder and are preserved through to the domino pushing formation of buckypaper.

Recently, a new scalable CNT film fabrication method has been developed: Surface-Engineered Tape Casting (SETC) technique. The SETC technique solves the main challenge of tape-casting which is the detachment of the dried and the typically sticky CNT film from the supporting-substrate. To achieve a perfect detached film, the supporting-substrate has to be engineered with micro-pyramid pore structure morphology. SETC produces large area films from any commercially available carbon nanotubes with tunable length, thickness, density and composition.

== Properties ==
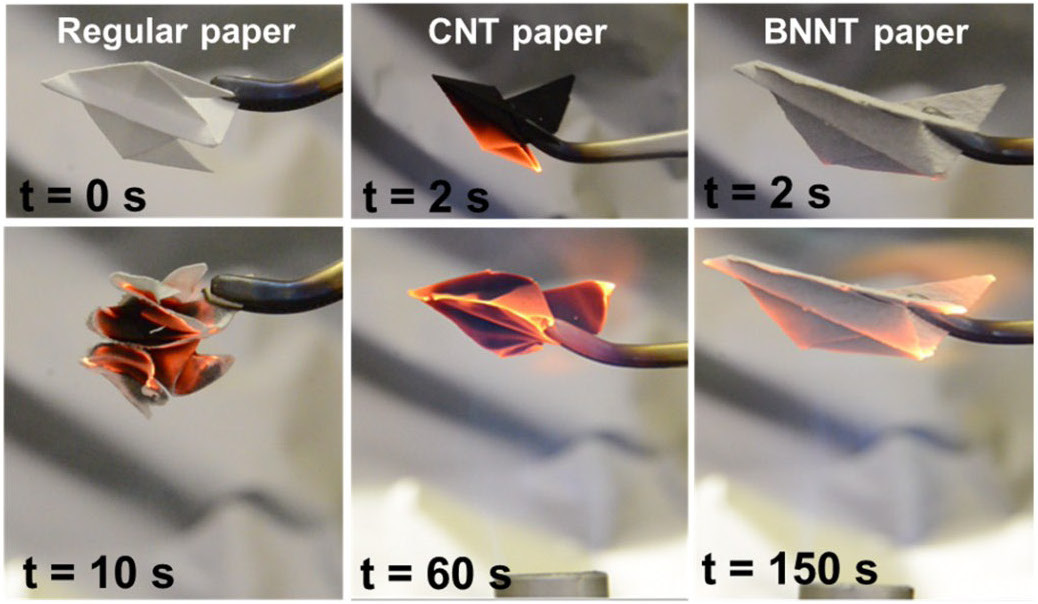
Comparative flame test of airplanes made of cellulose, carbon buckypaper and inorganic boron nitride nanotube buckypaper.

Buckypaper is one tenth the weight yet potentially 500 times stronger than steel when its sheets are stacked to form a composite. It could disperse heat like brass or steel and it could conduct electricity like copper or silicon.

== Applications ==
Among the possible uses for buckypaper that are being researched:

- Fire protection: covering material with a thin layer of buckypaper significantly improves its fire resistance due to the efficient reflection of heat by the dense, compact layer of carbon nanotubes or carbon fibers.
- If exposed to an electric charge, buckypaper could be used to illuminate computer and television screens. It could be more energy-efficient, lighter, and could allow for a more uniform level of brightness than current cathode ray tube (CRT) and liquid crystal display (LCD) technology.
- Since individual carbon nanotubes are one of the most thermally conductive materials known, buckypaper lends itself to the development of heat sinks that would allow computers and other electronic equipment to disperse heat more efficiently than is currently possible. This, in turn, could lead to even greater advances in electronic miniaturization.
- Films also could protect electronic circuits and devices within airplanes from electromagnetic interference, which can damage equipment and alter settings. Similarly, such films could allow military aircraft to shield their electromagnetic "signatures", which can be detected via radar.
- Buckypaper could act as a filter membrane to trap microparticles in air or fluid. Because the nanotubes in buckypaper are insoluble and can be functionalized with a variety of functional groups, they can selectively remove compounds or can act as a sensor.
- Produced in high enough quantities and at an economically viable price, buckypaper composites could serve as an effective armor plating.
- Buckypaper can be used to grow biological tissue, such as nerve cells. Buckypaper can be electrified or functionalized to encourage growth of specific types of cells.
- The Poisson's ratio for carbon nanotube buckypaper can be controlled and has exhibited auxetic behavior, capable of use as artificial muscles.
- Electrode materials for supercapacitors, lithium-ion batteries, and vanadium redox flow batteries.

== See also ==
- Frit compression
- Carbon nanotube
- Graphene oxide paper
- Potential applications of carbon nanotubes
- Graphene
