= Carbon filament =

Carbon filament may refer to:

- A carbon filament in an incandescent light bulb
- Filaments in the synthesis of carbon fibre

== See also ==
- Filamentous carbon
