= Carbon nanoscrolls =

The structure of carbon nanoscrolls is similar to that of a multi-walled carbon nanotube, but with a spiral-like rolled-up geometry and open edges at the ends.

A number of methods have been reported to produce carbon nanoscrolls, including arc discharge, high-energy ball milling, and intercalation, among others. Wedge based mechanical exfoliation is also reported to form carbon nanoscrolls experimentally. However, the real world applications of nanoscroll products are limited due to their difficult colloidal processing. Thermodynamically, the nanoscale surfaces are stacking each other via van der Waals force to lower the energy barrier. To overcome this problem and obtain high quality nanoscrolls, a polymer-assisted liquid exfoliation technique has been recently demonstrated, allowing to manufacture high throughput and high quality CNS dispersions. Other material-based nanoscrolls, e.g. gold nanoscrolls, were also successfully attained by the exfoliation technique.
