= Deposition (phase transition) =

Phase transition from gas to solid

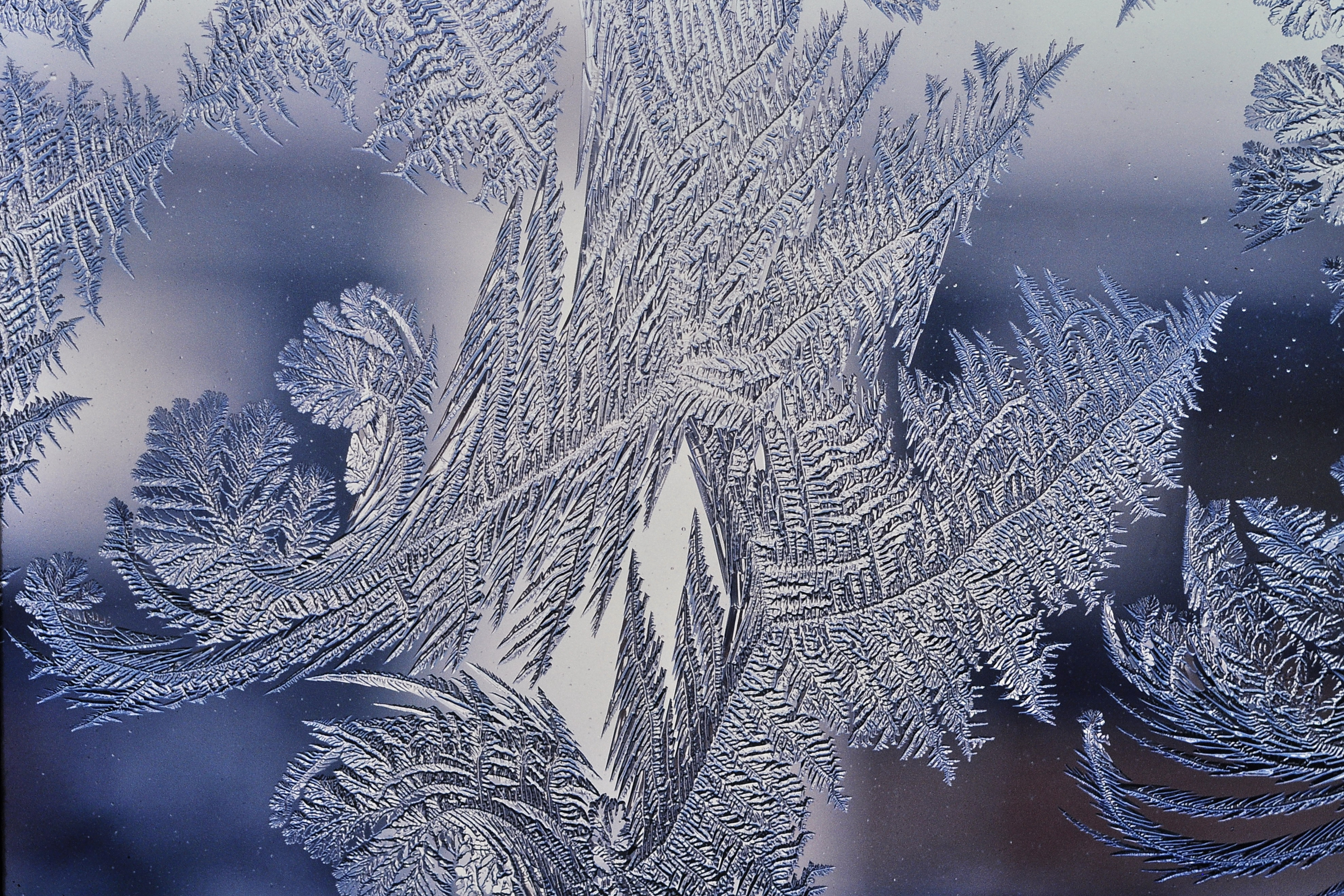
Water vapor from humid winter air deposits directly into a solid, crystalline frost pattern on a window, without ever being liquid in the process.

Deposition is the phase transition in which gas transforms into solid without passing through the liquid phase. Deposition is a thermodynamic process. The reverse of deposition is sublimation and hence sometimes deposition is called desublimation.

== Applications ==
=== Examples ===
One example of deposition is the process by which, in sub-freezing air, water vapor changes directly to ice without first becoming a liquid. This is how frost and hoar frost form on the ground or other surfaces, including leaves. For deposition to occur, thermal energy must be removed from a gas. When the air becomes cold enough, water vapor in the air surrounding a leaf loses enough thermal energy to change into a solid. Even though the air temperature may be below the dew point, the water vapor in the air alone may not condense spontaneously. This supercooled water vapor, when around a leaf, immediately begins to condense. Since it is already past the freezing point, the water vapor changes directly into solid frost.

Soot accumulates as an aerosol deposition. In a fireplace, soot is deposited on the walls of the chimney. Soot particles are aerosolized within volatile organic compounds (VOCs). These VOCs are in a hot and gaseous state, rising from the fire. When the VOCs come into contact with the walls, they cool, and change to the solid state, without formation of the liquid state. The soot particles also cling to the walls upon contact. This process is used industrially in combustion chemical vapor deposition.

=== Industrial applications ===
There is an industrial coating process, known as evaporative deposition, whereby a solid material is heated to the gaseous state (with no intermediate liquid state, i.e. it is sublimated) in a low-pressure chamber and the gas molecules travel across the chamber space and then deposit to the solid state on a target surface, forming a smooth and thin layer on the target surface. Again, the molecules do not go through an intermediate liquid state when going from the gas to the solid. See also physical vapor deposition, which is a class of processes used to deposit thin films of various materials onto various surfaces.

Deposition releases energy so is an exothermic phase change.

== Table ==
Phase transitions of matter
To From	Solid	Liquid	Gas	Plasma
Solid		Melting	Sublimation	ablation
Liquid	Freezing		Vaporization	
Gas	Deposition	Condensation		Ionization
Plasma			Recombination	
