= Carbon peapod =

Hybrid nanomaterial

Generation of fullerene molecules inside a carbon nanotube (CNT) – in situ transmission electron microscopy (TEM) observation.

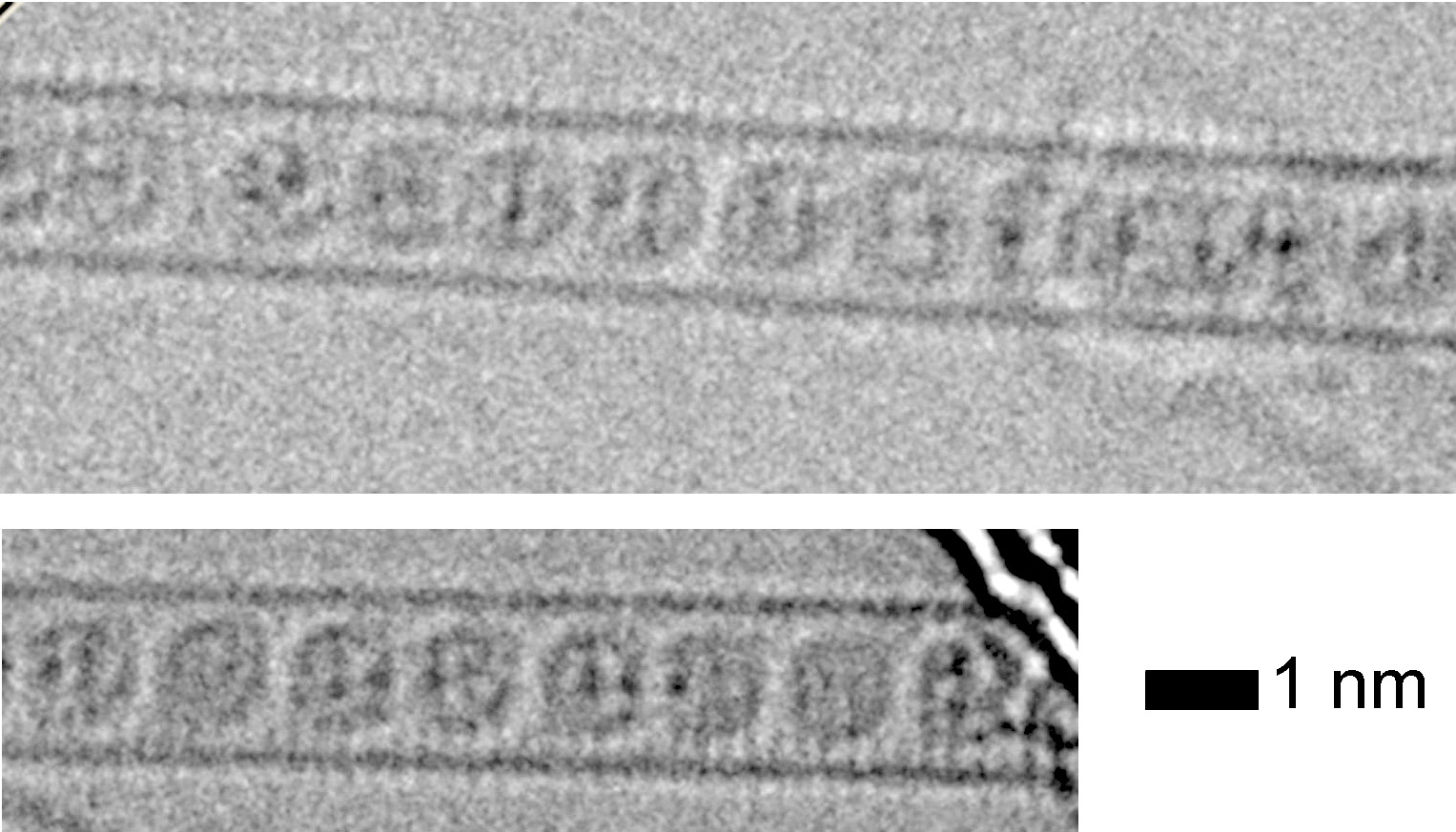
TEM images of M_{3}N@C_{80} peapods. Metal atoms (M = Ho or Sc) are seen as dark spots inside the fullerene molecules; they are doubly encapsulated in the C_{80} molecules and in the nanotubes.

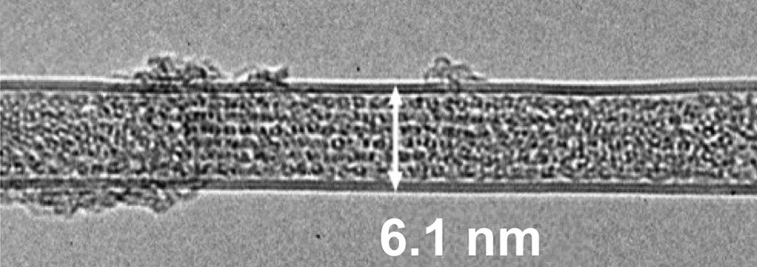
TEM image of a wide double-wall CNT densely filled with C_{60} fullerenes.

Carbon peapod is a hybrid nanomaterial consisting of spheroidal fullerenes encapsulated within a carbon nanotube. It is named due to their resemblance to the seedpod of the pea plant. Since the properties of carbon peapods differ from those of nanotubes and fullerenes, the carbon peapod can be recognized as a new type of a self-assembled graphitic structure. Possible applications of nano-peapods include nanoscale lasers, single electron transistors, spin-qubit arrays for quantum computing, nanopipettes, and data storage devices thanks to the memory effects and superconductivity of nano-peapods.

== History ==
Single-walled nanotubes (SWNTs) were first seen in 1993 as cylinders rolled from a single graphene sheet. In 1998, the first peapod was observed by Brian Smith, Marc Monthioux and David Luzzi. The idea of peapods came from the structure that was produced inside a transmission electron microscope in 2000. They were first recognized in fragments obtained by a pulsed-laser vaporization synthesis followed by treatment with an acid and annealing.

== Production and structure ==
Carbon peapods can be naturally produced during carbon nanotube synthesis by pulsed laser vaporization. C_{60} fullerene impurities are formed during the annealing treatment and acid purification, and enter the nanotubes through defects or vapor-phase diffusion. Fullerenes within a nanotube are only stabilized at a diameter difference of 0.34 nm or less, and when the diameters are nearly identical, the interacting energy heightens to such a degree (comparable to 0.1 GPa) that the fullerenes become unable to be extracted from the SWNT even under high vacuum. The encapsulated fullerenes have diameters close to that of C_{60} and form a chain inside the tube. Controlled production of carbon peapods allow for greater variety in both the nanotube structure and the fullerene composition. Varying elements can be incorporated into a carbon peapod through doping and will dramatically affect the resulting thermal and electrical conductivity properties.

== Chemical properties ==
The existence of carbon peapods demonstrates further properties of carbon nanotubes, such as potential to be a stringently controlled environment for reactions. C_{60} molecules normally form amorphous carbon when heated to 1000–1200 °C under ambient conditions; when heated to such a high temperature within a carbon nanotube, they instead merge in an ordered manner to form another SWNT, thus creating a double-wall carbon nanotube. Owing to the ease with which fullerenes can encapsulate or be doped with other molecules and the transparency of nanotubes to electron beams, carbon peapods can also serve as nano-scale test tubes. After fullerenes containing reactants diffuse into an SWNT, a high-energy electron beam can be used to induce high reactivity, thus triggering formation of C_{60} dimers and merging of their contents. Additionally, due to the enclosed fullerenes being limited to only a one-dimensional degree of mobility, phenomena such as diffusion or phase transformations can easily be studied.

== Electronic properties ==
The diameter of carbon peapods range from ca. 1 to 50 nanometers. Various combinations of fullerene C_{60} sizes and nanotube structures can lead to various electric conductivity property of carbon peapods due to orientation of rotations. For example, the C_{60} @ (10,10) is a good superconductor and the C_{60} @ (17,0) peapod is a semiconductor. The calculated band gap of C_{60} @ (17,0) equals 0.1 eV. Research into their potential as semiconductors is still ongoing. Although both the doped fullerides and ropes of SWNTs are superconductors, unfortunately, the critical temperatures for the superconducting phase transition in these materials are low. There are hopes that carbon nano-peapods could be superconducting at room temperature.

With chemical doping, the electronic characteristics of peapods can be further adjusted. When carbon peapod is doped with alkali metal atoms like potassium, the dopants will react with the C_{60} molecules inside the SWNT. It forms a negatively charged C_{60}^{6−} covalently bound, one-dimensional polymer chain with metallic conductivity. Overall, the doping of SWNTs and peapods by alkali metal atoms actively enhances the conductivity of the molecule since the charge is relocated from the metal ions to the nanotubes. Doping carbon nanotubes with oxidized metal is another way to adjust conductivity. It creates a very interesting high temperature superconducting state as the Fermi level is significantly reduced. A good application would be the introduction of silicon dioxide to carbon nanotubes. It constructs memory effect as some research group has invented ways to create memory devices based on carbon peapods grown on Si/SiO_{2} surfaces.
