= Pillared graphene =

Pillared graphene is a hybrid carbon, structure consisting of an oriented array of carbon nanotubes connected at each end to a sheet of graphene. It was first described theoretically by George Froudakis and colleagues of the University of Crete in Greece in 2008. Pillared graphene has not yet been synthesised in the laboratory, but it has been suggested that it may have useful electronic properties, or as a hydrogen storage material.
