= Amroy Europe =

Defunct Finnish chemical company

Amroy Europe, Ltd.
- Native name: Amroy Europe Oy
- Company type: Limited company (osakeyhtiö)
- Industry: Chemicals, technology
- Founded: 2005
- Defunct: 2016
- Headquarters: Lahti, Finland
- Products: Hybtonite, composite resin reinforced with carbon nanotubes (CNT), Epobiox

Amroy Europe, Ltd. (natively: Amroy Europe Oy) was a Finnish company that developed and manufactured composite resins, carbon nanoepoxy resins, bioresins and special pastes. It was headquartered in Lahti, Finland.

The main products were Hybtonite, composite resin reinforced with carbon nanotubes (CNT), and Epobiox, liquid epoxy system which is 70% made from natural oils.

== History ==
The roots of the company were in Nanoscience Center of the University of Jyväskylä. In 2004, professor Jorma Virtanen and nanoscientist Pasi Keinänen developed a method to bond carbon nanotubes with resins utilizing strong covalent bonds. This resulted in development of Hybtonite.

Nanolab Systems Oy was established by the researchers. Their main focus area was nano particle synthesis technology and instruments for drug research.

Amroy Europe was established in 2005 as spin-off of Nanolab Systems Oy.

First commercial product using Hybtonite was hockey stick "Nitro" by Montreal Sports Oy. It was voted number one Nano product in the world at the Nanotechnology 2006 show in Tokyo, Japan.

In December 2009, Amroy Europe received Frost & Sullivan European Technology Innovation Award for its work on hybtonite.

== Partners ==
Amroy Europe used carbon nanotubes manufactured by Bayer.

In addition to Amroy Europe's own production, Hybtonite is manufactured under license in China.

Hybtonite is used for small size wind turbine blades by Eagle Windpower (Finland), and for large size windmill blades by Evergreen (China) and LM Glassfiber (Denmark).

One of the main application areas for Hybtonite is sports gear. Some examples of the manufacturers are Montreal Sports Oy (hockey sticks), Peltonen Sports (cross-country skis and roller skis), Karhu Sports (baseball bats), Easton (hunting arrows), Entropy Surfboards (surfboards), and Sport Lettmann (kayaks).

In marine applications, Hybtonite is used for laminating and for marine paints. Some of the users are Baltic Yachts and Cathay Yachts.
