= Graphenated carbon nanotube =

Carbon nanomaterial

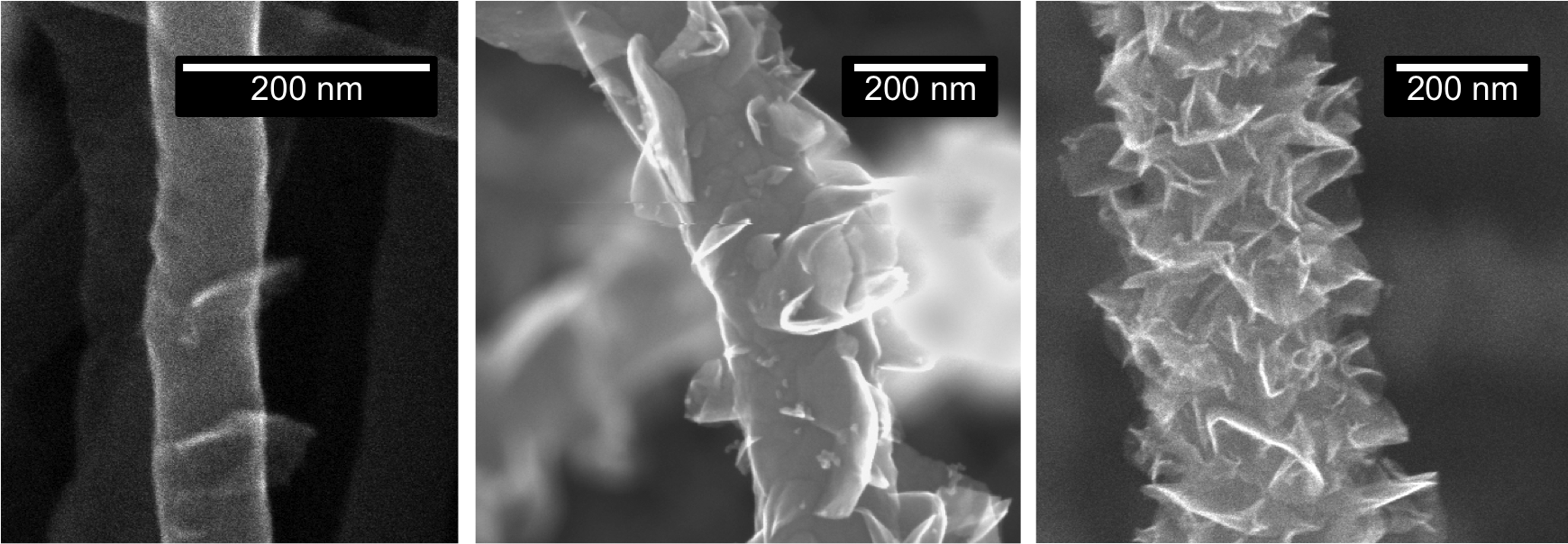
SEM series of graphenated CNTs with varying foliate density

Graphenated carbon nanotubes (G-CNTs) are a relatively new hybrid that combines graphitic foliates grown along the sidewalls of multiwalled or bamboo style carbon nanotubes (CNTs). Yu et al. reported on "chemically bonded graphene leaves" growing along the sidewalls of CNTs. Stoner et al. described these structures as "graphenated CNTs" and reported in their use for enhanced supercapacitor performance. Hsu et al. further reported on similar structures formed on carbon fiber paper, also for use in supercapacitor applications. Pham et al. also reported a similar structure, namely "graphene-carbon nanotube hybrids", grown directly onto carbon fiber paper to form an integrated, binder free, high surface area conductive catalyst support for Proton Exchange Membrane Fuel Cells electrode applications with enhanced performance and durability. The foliate density can vary as a function of deposition conditions (e.g. temperature and time) with their structure ranging from few layers of graphene (< 10) to thicker, more graphite-like.

The fundamental advantage of an integrated graphene-CNT structure is the high surface area three-dimensional framework of the CNTs coupled with the high edge density of graphene. Graphene edges provide significantly higher charge density and reactivity than the basal plane, but they are difficult to arrange in a three-dimensional, high volume-density geometry. CNTs are readily aligned in a high density geometry (i.e., a vertically aligned forest) but lack high charge density surfaces—the sidewalls of the CNTs are similar to the basal plane of graphene and exhibit low charge density except where edge defects exist. Depositing a high density of graphene foliates along the length of aligned CNTs can significantly increase the total charge capacity per unit of nominal area as compared to other carbon nanostructures.

G-CNTs address several limitations of graphene and SWCNTs. While graphene has high edge density, it suffers from restacking in bulk forms due to π–π interactions between layers, which reduces accessibility of edge sites and limits surface area for reactions like charge transfer. SWCNTs, though excellent for mechanical strength and 1D electron mobility, have limited edge density as most of their carbon atoms are in the basal plane of the tube, with edge sites only at the tube ends. In contrast, G-CNTs integrate the high surface area of CNTs with additional graphene foliates on the sidewalls, significantly increasing the edge density and providing more active sites for charge transfer. Additionally, G-CNTs avoid the bundling issues seen in SWCNTs and the restacking issues seen in graphene, maintaining a stable 3D structure where the graphene foliates prevent agglomeration and keep the edges exposed for reactions like charge storage and catalysis. This enhanced edge density, coupled with their stable, non-bundling structure, ensures greater reactivity, better ion accessibility, and improved durability in high-performance applications. G-CNTs offer a highly efficient and durable solution, combining the high surface area of CNTs with the excellent edge reactivity of graphene.

In a study by Lawal et al., G-CNTs were added to titanium dioxide (TiO_{2}) to improve the performance of bifacial dye-sensitized solar cells (DSSCs). G-CNTs was incorporated at concentrations of 0.0025 wt%, 0.0050 wt%, and 0.0100 wt%. The aim was to boost charge transfer efficiency and light absorption. The best results came from using 0.005 wt% G-CNTs, which increased the power conversion efficiency (PCE) by 20%, from 3.76% to 4.53%. Adding a second layer of the optimized TiO_{2}/g-CNT composite further raised the PCE to 5.90%, a 56.8% improvement over TiO_{2} and 27.7% over the TiO_{2}/g-CNT variant. g-CNTs enhanced light absorption, especially on the back side of the DSSC, where light is weaker. This lowered series resistance (from 12.80 Ω/13.38 Ω) and charge transfer resistance (from 7.5 Ω to 5.5 Ω), indicating improved charge transfer and less recombination. The G-CNTs also helped maintain the composite's stability, confirmed by imaging and analysis, and its graphitic structure improved charge transfer efficiency.

Ismail et al. investigated a continuous synthesis of bulk cotton-like (aerogel) structure of graphenated carbon nanotubes (G-CNTs) via floating catalyst chemical vapor deposition (FCCVD) method. They analysed how changes in the injection rate of the carbon source influenced G-CNTs formation. Their research revealed that an injection rate of 5 ml/h led to optimal synthesis, resulting in improved electrical conductivity and superior gas-sensing capabilities compared to traditional carbon nanotubes (CNTs). Abdullah et al introduced grapeseed oil as a precursor for G-CNTs hybrids, synthesizing mesoporous three-dimensional (3D) G-CNT aerogels with unique morphological features, such as highly disordered multi-wall carbon nanotube (MWCNT) bundles rounded by graphene foliate structures. Yusuf et al conducted a comparative study of G-CNTs as counter electrodes in dye-sensitized solar cells (DSSCs), demonstrating their superior electrical conductivity and catalytic activity compared to standard carbon nanotubes and even conventional platinum layers. Yusuf et al's investigation also highlighted the excellent conductivity of G-CNT sheets, attributing it to their hybrid structure, which presents them as promising candidates to replace conventional platinum as counter electrodes in DSSCs.

In addition to their promise in fuel cells and DSSCs, G-CNTs have shown considerable potential in flexible supercapacitor applications. Flexible SCs, typically fabricated using carbon-based materials, are vital for powering next-generation lightweight, wearable electronics. However, improvements in their energy density, power density, and cycling durability remain key challenges. A study describes the use of G-CNT cotton substrates integrated with vertically aligned MoS₂ and WS₂ nanosheets, synthesized through time-modulated radio frequency (RF) magnetron sputtering. The high volume-to-surface ratio of these transition metal dichalcogenide (TMD) vertical structures, when combined with the conductive, high-surface G-CNT substrate, resulted in significantly enhanced SC performance. Galvanostatic charge–discharge (GCD) measurements recorded an aerial capacitance of 131.2 mF cm⁻² for WS₂ electrodes and 97.60 mF cm⁻² for MoS₂ electrodes. Flexibility tests using angle-dependent cyclic voltammetry (CV) confirmed mechanical robustness, and stability studies over 10,000 cycles demonstrated capacitance retention exceeding 96%. These findings show the feasibility of integrating G-CNTs with vertically aligned TMD nanostructures to fabricate next-generation flexible SCs with enhanced capacitance, stability, and flexibility.

In a notable advancement for photovoltaic materials, researchers have successfully enhanced the electrical properties of inorganic nickel oxide (NiO) hole transport layers in perovskite solar cells by fabricating a composite matrix with graphenated carbon nanotubes (g-CNTs). Although pristine NiO offers high stability and low cost, its practical adoption is severely bottlenecked by low carrier concentrations and high intrinsic resistivity . To overcome this limitation, a low concentration of 0.5 wt% bulk-cotton-like g-CNTs synthesized via floating catalyst chemical vapor deposition (FCCVD) was introduced into sol-gel derived NiO thin films. The 3D hierarchical network of g-CNTs successfully bridged the grain boundaries within the NiO matrix, significantly decreasing the film's electrical resistance from 255.5 kΩ to 67.284 kΩ. This structural integration resulted in a substantial electrical conductivity increase from 0.138 S·cm⁻¹ to 0.538 S·cm⁻¹, effectively mitigating the carrier scattering typically associated with small crystallite sizes and providing a reliable method to optimize charge extraction in next-generation solar energy systems.

Researchers also established the structure-transport relationships of lightweight graphenated carbon nanotube (g-CNT) aerogels synthesized via floating catalyst chemical vapor deposition (FCCVD). Structural characterization demonstrated that g-CNTs possess an increased structural lattice disorder and a reduced long-range graphitic order, as shown by a broadened (002) X-ray diffraction reflection and an elevated Raman disorder ratio (ID/IG) of 1.13. Additionally, the radially grown graphene sheets partially obstruct mesoporous channels, resulting in a lower Brunauer-Emmett-Teller (BET) specific surface area of 19 m²/g compared to 157 m²/g for pristine CNTs. Despite this increased structural disorder and lower geometric surface area, the g-CNTs achieved nearly double the bulk electrical conductivity of pristine CNTs, rising from 1.64 S/cm to 3.24 S/cm. This improvement demonstrates that bulk conductivity is governed primarily by graphene-mediated junction engineering rather than perfect crystallinity, as the foliates serve as electronic bridges that significantly lower inter-tube contact resistance. Electrochemical testing via impedance spectroscopy and cyclic voltammetry independently validated that both junction and charge-transfer resistances reach an absolute minimum at an optimal electrode thickness of 150 µm, allowing the kinetically optimized hybrid networks to deliver a four-fold higher specific capacitance and a peak areal capacitance of 0.491 mF/cm².
