= Electrically conducting yarn =

Any yarn that conducts electricity

An electrically conducting yarn is a yarn that conducts electricity. Conducting yarns are used to manufacture carpets and other items that dissipate static electricity, such as work clothes in highly flammable environments, e.g., in the petrochemistry industry.

There are several methods known to manufacture electrically conductive textiles. The simplest way is to incorporate metal wires or wire meshes into fabrics. Another approach is to use metalized yarns. In staple yarns, it is possible to spin short strands of regular yarns with metal yarns. Electrically conducting yarns may be made of a central metal strand with regular yarn woven around it. It is however also possible to coat a base polymer (such as Polyamide 6 or Polyester) with metal like silver. Yarns of that sort are for example "Shieldex" or "SwicoSilver" whereas it is only possible with the latter to coat non-Polyamides as well. Furthermore, it is possible to coat filament yarns with other metals than silver with the underlying coating technology of SwicoSilver yarns: Gold coated polyester yarns are for example no impossibility anymore.

An altogether different approach involves yarns based on conductive polymers, such as polyaniline.

Electrically conductive yarns can also be produced from carbon nanotubes (CNT). Individual CNT-based fibers are spun (wet spinning) into a fiber directly from a solution. The solution either contains pre-made dissolved CNTs or the combination of chemicals required to synthesis CNTs. Tens to hundreds of individual fibers can be woven into a yarn. CNT-based yarns find applications in energy and electrochemical water treatment and can replace copper windings, e.g. in motors, which would improve the efficiency and consequently reduce the use of energy.
