= Hybtonite =

Synthetic material

Hybtonite is trademark of Amroy Europe Oy for carbon nanoepoxy resins. It is a family of composite resins reinforced with carbon nanotubes (CNTs).

The material and the manufacturing method were originally developed in the Nanoscience Center of the University of Jyväskylä during the years 2002 to 2004. Ultrasound is used to disperse the nanotubes and to create radicals at the ends of CNT molecules. CNTs can then chemically react with epoxy resin or other material forming strong covalent bonds. This results in a more durable hybrid composite structure that is between 20% and 30% stronger (with only 0.5% CNT contents) than a conventional reinforced plastic.

The manufacturing process allows controlling the material properties such as electrical conductivity, thermal conductivity and viscosity. Different forms of hybtonite are available for different purposes such as laminating (glass fiber, carbon fiber), epoxy paints and glues.

== Applications ==
The first application areas for hybtonite have been in field of wind turbines, marine applications and sports gear.

- Montreal Nitro ice hockey stick was the first commercial product using hybtonite.
- Cross-country skis and roller skis by Peltonen Sports
- Baseball bats by Karhu Sports
- Hunting arrows by Easton
- Surfboards by Entropy Surfboards
- Eagle Windpower manufactures small size (2 kW to 100 kW) wind turbines using hybtonite as material for the blades.
- Large wind turbines manufactured by Evergreen (China), LM Glassfiber (Denmark) and CompoTech (Czech Republic)
- Marine paints / AMC nano coating.

== Awards ==
In January 2006, Montreal Hybtonite hockey stick "Nitro" was voted number one Nano product in the world at Nanotech 2006 trade show in Tokyo, Japan.

In December 2009, Amroy received Frost & Sullivan European Technology Innovation Award for its work on hybtonite.
