= Ninithi =

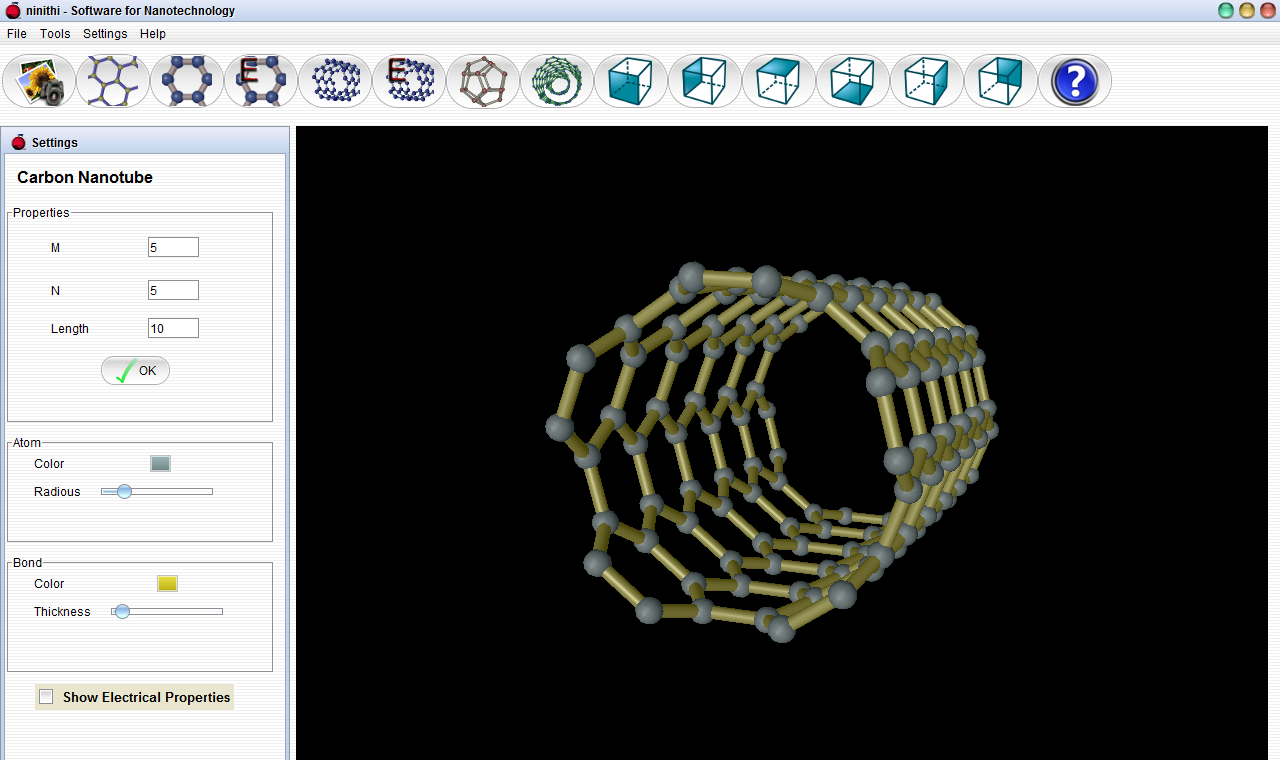
A screenshot of Ninithi software

Ninithi (Sinhala: නිනිති) is free and open source modelling software that can be used to visualize and analyze carbon materials used in nanotechnology. Users of ninithi can visualize the 3D molecular geometries of graphene/nano-ribbons, carbon nanotubes (both single wall and multi-wall) and fullerenes. Ninithi also provides features to simulate the electronic band structures of graphene and carbon nanotubes. The software was developed by Lanka Software Foundation, in Sri Lanka and released in 2010 under the GPL licence. Ninithi is written in the Java programming language and available for both Microsoft Windows and Linux platforms.

Generalized equations and algorithms used in ninithi were published in 2010.

== See also ==
- SAMSON: a software platform for integrated computational nanoscience
