= Filamentous carbon =

Filamentous carbon is a carbon-containing deposit structure that refers to several allotropes of carbon, including carbon nanotubes, carbon nanofibers, and microcoils. It forms from gaseous carbon compounds. Filamentous carbon structures all contain metal particles. These are either iron, cobalt, or nickel or their alloys. Deposits of it also significantly disrupt synthesis gas methanation. Acetylene is involved in a number of method of the production of filamentous carbon. The structures of filamentous carbon are mesoporous and on the micrometer scale in dimension. Most reactions that form the structures take place at or above 280 °C (536 °F).

Filamentous carbon's applications include cleaning up spills of crude oil and the creation of strong and lightweight composites. Filamentous carbon also has significantly different thermodynamic properties from graphite, another form of carbon. However, filamentous carbon partially consists of graphite sheets.

== Properties ==
Filamentous carbon structures typically range between 10 and 500 nanometers in diameter. They are typically 10,000 nanometers (10 micrometers) long. They have a duplex structure. The outside of the structures is difficult to oxidize, but the core oxidizes more easily. A metal particle is typically located at the growing end of the structure, although it is sometimes found in the middle of it instead. Also, more than one filament can sometimes grow out of one metal particle. Filamentous carbon is either helical, straight, or twisted. It contains graphite layers in a conical shape. They planes of graphite located close to the interface between the carbon and the nickel atom in the filament are parallel to the interface. The filaments can also be hollow.

Filamentous carbon has thermodynamic properties that are different from those of graphite. This is partially due to the fact that the structure of filamentous carbon is more disordered than the structure of graphite. Other theories on the difference in properties include that the deviation is based on the formation of an intermediate phase of carbides. This theory was proposed by De Bokx et al. and Manning et al.. However, it is unlikely if the central metal atom is nickel because in that case, since carbides decompose at 350 °C (662 °F), and carbides formation was not observed during such a reaction.

A difference between the solubities of metal and filamentous carbon also allows carbon diffusion to occur. When the allotrope engages in a gasification reaction below 600 °C (1,112 °F), the reaction's activation energy is approximately 178 kilojoules per mole.

Filamentous carbon is mesoporous and has unusual textural properties. It also has paramagnetic properties. It also has a high level of mechanical strength.

The nickel particles located in filamentous carbon that is grown in methane and hydrogen gas between 490 °C (914 °F) and 590 °C (1,094 °F) tend to be pear-shaped at the higher end of the temperature range. At higher temperatures, the metal particle becomes deformed. The length of the conic structure of the filaments also increases with temperature. When a copper and silica catalyst is exposed to methane and hydrogen at 927 °C (1,701 °F), hollow, long filamentous carbon structures were formed, and these also contained drops of metal.

=== Biological properties ===
When the enzyme glucoamylase is situated on a ceramic surface coated with filamentous carbon, the enzyme's stability increases drastically.

== Occurrence ==
Filamentous carbon typically forms on metals, including iron, cobalt, and nickel. Hydrogen is also required for filamentous carbon to form. However, they also form on alloys of these metals. Iron is a better material for forming filamentous carbon on than nickel is. For instance, in the presence of methanol, at a pressure of 7 kilopascals and a temperature of 500 °C (932 °F), filamentous carbon grows on iron, but not nickel. Formation of the material on those metals typically occurs at temperatures between 327 °C (621 °F) and 1,027 °C (1,881 °F). It also forms when chromium is used as a catalyst to decompose acetylene. Filamentous carbon is also one of up to seven allotropes of carbon to form during coke formation on reactor tubes and catalysts. The allotrope has the ability to destroy catalyst support structures, thus blocking reactors. It also forms during stream reforming, along with other varieties of carbon.

== Synthesis ==
Filamentous carbon can also be synthesized by cracking methane. The product is then gasified by hydrogen. In the experiment that discovered this, a nickel particle was used as the metal particle for the filament. The filament precipitates on the nickel particle's "support side".

Filamentous carbon can also form when acetylene decomposes on films of palladium and silicon dioxide. However, filamentous carbon does not form on the palladium and silicon dioxide films if they are preheated with hydrogen at temperatures of 597 °C (1,107 °F). This is because in those conditions, the palladium and silicon dioxide react to form palladium silicide. Iron and silicon dioxide together also act as a catalyst for formation of the structures. Sometimes, iron silicate forms during this reaction.

Another experiment showed that filamentous carbon can form when carbon monoxide is disproportionated over cobaltosic oxide. In the experiment, a heated carburizing gas mixture was sent over powdered cobaltosic oxide. Filamentous carbon is the main deposit that forms from this reaction when it is carried out at 600 °C (1,112 °F).

When chlorobenzene is hydrodechlorinated over nickel and silica, highly ordered structures of filamentous carbon form. When potassium and bromine are present, this reaction can occur at temperatures as low as 280 °C (536 °F). This is because the potassium and bromine aided in restructuring the active sites, thus causing destructive chemisorption of the reactant and also causing the a precipitate of carbon to form. Adding potassium hydroxide to the mixture of nickel and silica in the reaction made little change to the yield of the reaction. However, the addition of potassium bromide significantly increased the yield. Other alkali metal bromides also allow the reaction and the formation of filamentous carbon to occur. Such alkali metal bromides include cesium bromide.

Filamentous carbon can also be synthesized by decomposing chromium carbide at 100 to 200 megapascals and 350 °C (662 °F) to 800 °C (1,470 °F). It has also been formed with a catalyst of cobalt and aluminum phosphate at 2 megapascals and 220 °C (428 °F) to 240 °C (464 °F). The presence of ruthenium in this reaction lessens the yield of filamentous carbon.

== Applications ==
Filamentous carbon has been used to clean up oil spills. This works by the filaments bonding to crude oil. It is also used in light-weight composite materials that must have strength at high temperatures.

== History ==
Filamentous carbon has been known since at least 1890, when P. and L. Schützenberger observed it while passing cyanogen over red-hot porcelain. In the 1950s, it was discovered that the filaments could be produced by the reactions of gases such as hydrocarbons with metals such as iron, cobalt, and nickel. The first electron micrographs of tubular versions of the filaments appeared in 1952. Between the 1970s and the 1990s, filamentous carbon has been the subject of a number of research efforts. These studies included studies of the thermodynamic properties of the formation of the allotrope. The most significant study that took place during that time was conducted by Terry Baker in the 1970s and concerned keeping filamentous carbon from growing inside the cooling pipes of nuclear reactors.

== See also ==
- Allotropes of carbon
- Graphite
- Carbon nanotube
