= Wedge-based mechanical exfoliation =

Wedge-based mechanical exfoliation is a method that involves the use of an ultra-sharp single crystal diamond wedge to penetrate inside a material and cleave a thin layer of material. It was proposed to produce few layers of graphene from a bulk highly ordered pyrolytic graphite (HOPG).

Molecular dynamics simulations studies have been performed to understand how and under what conditions graphene layers separate, fold and shear during the wedge-based mechanical exfoliation machining technique. Molecular simulations of initial wedge engagement show that the entry location of the wedge tip, vis-a-vis the nearest graphene layer, plays a key role in determining whether layers separate or fold and which layers and how many of them fold.
