= Combustion chemical vapor deposition =

Chemical process

Combustion chemical vapor deposition (CCVD) is a chemical process by which thin-film coatings are deposited onto substrates in the open atmosphere.

== History ==
In the 1980s initial attempts were performed to improve the adhesion of metal-plastic composites in dental ceramics using flame-pyrolytically deposited silicon dioxide (SiO_{2}). The silicoater process derived from these studies provided a starting point in the development of CCVD processes. This process was constantly developed and new applications for flame-pyrolytically deposited SiO_{2} layers where found. At this time, the name "Pyrosil" was coined for these layers. Newer and ongoing studies deal with deposition of other materials (vide infra).

== Principles and procedure ==
In the CCVD process, a precursor compound, usually a metal-organic compound or a metal salt, is added to the burning gas. The flame is moved closely above the surface to be coated. The high energy within the flame converts the precursors into highly reactive intermediates, which readily react with the substrate, forming a firmly adhering deposit. The microstructure and thickness of the deposited layer can be controlled by varying process parameters such as speed of substrate or flame, number of passes, substrate temperature and distance between flame and substrate. CCVD can produce coatings with orientation from preferred to epitaxial, and can produce conformal layers less than 10 nm thick. Thus, CCVD technique is a true vapor deposition process for making thin film coatings. The CCVD coating process has the ability to deposit thin films in the open atmosphere using inexpensive precursor chemicals in solution leading to continuous, production-line manufacturing. It does not require post-deposition treatment e.g., annealing. The throughput potential is high. Coatings can be deposited at substantial temperatures, for example, alpha-alumina was deposited on Ni-20Cr at temperatures between 1050 and 1125 C. A 1999 review article summarizes the various oxide coatings that had been deposited to date, which included Al_{2}O_{3}, Cr_{2}O_{3}, SiO_{2}, CeO_{2}, some spinel oxides (MgAl_{2}O_{4}, NiAl_{2}O_{4}), and yttria stabilized zirconia (YSZ).

== Remote combustion chemical vapor deposition (r-CCVD) ==
The so-called remote combustion chemical vapour deposition is a new variant of the classical CCVD process. It likewise uses flames to deposit thin films, however, this method is based on other chemical reaction mechanisms and offers further abilities for deposition of layer systems which are not practicable by means of CCVD, e.g. titanium dioxide.

== Applications ==
Typical applications for layers deposited by CCVD
Layer material	Application
SiO_{2}	– Silicon dioxide layers are the most commonly deposited layers. Freshly deposited layers are highly reactive and can thus serve as adhesion promoting layers for polymer coatings and bondings. Adhesion can be further improved by application of additional silane-based adhesion promoters such as glymo (glycidoxypropyl trimethoxysilane). – modification of optical properties (e.g. transmission enhancement) – barrier layers against gases such as O_{2} (e.g. as a protective layer on an alloy) and ions such as Na^{+}
WO_{x}, MoO_{x}	– chromogenic materials in "intelligent windows“
ZnO	– semiconductor – component in transparent conducting oxides (TCO) such as aluminum-doped zinc-oxide (AZO)
ZrO_{2}	– layer protecting against mechanical damages (e.g. abrasion, scratches)
SnO_{2}	– component in various transparent conducting oxides, such as tin-doped indium-oxide (ITO) and fluorine doped tin oxide (FTO)
TiO_{2}	– photo catalytic layers
Ag	– good electric conductivity – heat protection glass – antibacterial coatings
Al_{2}O_{3}	– protection against corrosion of alloys such as Ni-20Cr, protection against corrosion of glass.

== Pros and cons ==
- Cost-effective, partly because no devices for generation and maintenance of a vacuum are needed
- Flexible in use due to various implementations
- Fewer layer materials compared to some low-pressure methods, limited primarily to oxides. The exceptions are some precious metals such as silver, gold and platinum
- Limited to layer materials, for which suitable precursors are available, however, this is the case for most metals

== See also ==
- Chemical vapor deposition
- Atomic layer deposition, a more precise and conformal coating technology
- Physical vapor deposition, the deposition of materials from vapor without chemical reactions
- Plasma-enhanced chemical vapor deposition
