= Gam =

Gam or GAM may refer to:

== Arts and entertainment ==
- GAM (group), a Japanese pop idol duo active in the 1980s and 1990s
- Centro Cultural Gabriela Mistral, a cultural center in Santiago, Chile
- Galería de Arte Mexicano, an art gallery in Mexico City, specializing in modern Mexican art
- Galleria d'Arte Moderna (Milan), an art museum in Milan, Italy, housing a collection of modern and contemporary art
- Modern Art Gallery Sant'Anna, an art gallery in Palermo, Italy, focused on modern and contemporary works

== Places ==
- Gam, Cornwall, a hamlet in the parish of St. Keverne, Cornwall, England
- Gam, Rolpa, a village development committee in Rolpa District, Lumbini Province, Nepal
- Greater Amman Municipality, the local government body responsible for the city of Amman, Jordan
- Greater Metropolitan Area (Costa Rica), the main urban region of Costa Rica, known in Spanish as the Spanish: Gran Área Metropolitana
- Gambell Airport, a public airport serving Gambell, Alaska, United States; its IATA code is GAM
- The Gambia, a country in West Africa; GAM is its IOC and UNDP country code

== Science and technology ==
- Gene-activated matrix, a type of biomaterial used in tissue engineering to deliver genes to cells
- Genome architecture mapping, a computational biology method used to study the three‑dimensional structure of genomes
- General Aggression Model, a psychological framework that explains how situational and personal factors influence aggressive behavior
- Generalized additive model, a flexible statistical regression model that allows non‑linear relationships between predictors and the response variable
- Global Acute Malnutrition, a public health indicator used to classify the severity of undernutrition in children under five years of age
- Gravity-assisted microdissection, a laboratory technique that uses gravity to assist in the precise dissection of biological samples

== Organizations and companies ==
- Grupo de Apoyo Mutuo, a Guatemalan human rights organization founded in 1984 to support victims of state violence
- GAM (company), a Swiss investment management company, now part of the Julius Baer Group
- GAM Esports, a Vietnamese professional esports organization
- General American Investors Company, an American closed‑end investment company traded on the New York Stock Exchange
- Free Aceh Movement (Indonesian: Gerakan Aceh Merdeka), a former separatist and paramilitary organization in Aceh, Indonesia, which was active until the 2005 peace agreement

== Other uses ==
- Gam (name), a given name or surname, including a list of people with this name
- Gam language, a Sino‑Tibetan language spoken in China
- Gam (nautical term), a social visit or meeting between two whaling ships at sea

== See also ==
- Gam-Gam, an alternate spelling for Qamqam, a municipality in the Goranboy District of Azerbaijan
- Gaam (disambiguation)
- Gama (disambiguation)
- Gamma (disambiguation)
