= Grandma (disambiguation) =

A grandma is a female grandparent.

Grandma may also refer to:

- Grandma (album), by Unique, 2018
- Grandma (comic strip), a 1947–1969 strip by Charles Kuhn
- Grandma (1979 film) or La Nona, an Argentine comedy drama film
- Grandma (2015 film), a comedy-drama film by Paul Weitz
- Grandma (2022 film), an Indian Tamil-language thriller film
- Khonnor or Grandma (born 1986), American electronic musician
- "Grandma" a song by Jay Chou from the 2004 album Common Jasmine Orange
- "Grandma", a song by ASAP Ferg from the 2016 album Always Strive and Prosper
- "Global Rapid Advanced Network Devoted to the Multi-messenger Addicts (GRANDMA)", a network of telescopes

== See also ==
- Grama (disambiguation)
- Gramma (disambiguation)
- Grandmama (The Addams Family)
- Granma (disambiguation)
- Granny (disambiguation)
