= Gamston =

Gamston may refer to:

== Places ==
- Gamston, Bassetlaw, near Retford, in the north of Nottinghamshire, England
- Gamston, Rushcliffe, near West Bridgford, in the south of Nottinghamshire, England

== Other uses ==
- Retford Gamston Airport, between Retford and Gamston in Nottinghamshire, England
- HMS Gamston, a British Royal Navy ship name
  - HMS Gamston (M1139), a Royal Navy Cold War minesweeper

== See also ==
- Gams (disambiguation)
- Gam (disambiguation)
