= Impalement (disambiguation) =

Impalement is perforating the body with a long object as a method of torture or execution

Impalement or impaled may refer to:

- Penetrating trauma caused by a long object
- Impaled (illusion), a magic trick simulating impalement
- Impaled (band), American death metal band
- Impalement arts, a group of performing arts that includes knife throwing
- Impalement (heraldry), a way of combining two coats-of-arms
- "Impaled", a song by Anthrax from the album For All Kings, 2016

== See also ==
- Impalefection, gene delivery method
