= Gram (disambiguation) =

Gram is a unit of mass.

Gram may also refer to:

== Mythology and fiction ==
- Gram (mythology), a sword in Norse mythology
- Gram of Denmark, a legendary king
- Mount Gram (Middle-earth), a fictional place in Tolkien's writings
- The lance of Gallantmon in the Japanese anime television series Digimon Tamers

== People ==
- Gram (surname), a list of people
- Gram Parsons (1946–1973), American singer and musician
- Short for grandmother

== Places ==
- Gram, Denmark, a town
- Gram Municipality, a former municipality in Denmark
- Gram panchayat, a local government division in India

== Plants ==
- Gram, a type of chickpea
- Gram, an abbreviation of Grammatophyllum, an orchid genus

== Science and technology ==
- Gram, a Hewlett Packard subsidiary formed from their acquisition of Palm, Inc.
- Grand River Aseptic Manufacturing, a sterile pharmaceutical contract manufacturer
- Gram stain
- Gram (text editor), a fork of Zed
- LG Gram, a series of laptop computers by LG Electronics

== Other uses ==
- Grand Rapids Art Museum (GRAM), Michigan
- Gramin Agriculture Markets (GrAM), in India
- Slang term for Instagram, a social media photo-sharing service
- Gram, a squadron in Ace Combat 7: Skies Unknown
- The Gram, a 2016 short film involving Ser'Darius Blain

== See also ==
- Vigna mungo, a bean also known as black gram
- Mung bean, also called green gram
- Macrotyloma uniflorum, a legume also known as horse gram and Madras gram
- Pigeon pea, also called red gram
- Vigna aconitifolia, also known as moth gram and Turkish gram
- Gramm (disambiguation)
- Grams (disambiguation)
- Grama (disambiguation)
- Gamma (disambiguation)
- Gam (disambiguation)
- Gama (disambiguation)
