= Shindai =

Shindai may refer to:

- Kobe University
- Shinshu University
