= Gamma value =

Gamma value may refer to:

- Gamma correction, used in video or still image systems.
- Gamma function, a mathematical extension of the factorial function to complex numbers.

== See also ==
- Gamma (disambiguation)
