= Gaam =

Gaam may refer to:

- Gam, Rolpa, a village development committee, in Nepal
- Gaam language, or Ingessana, an Eastern Sudanic language spoken by the Ingessana people

== See also ==
- Gam (disambiguation)
