= Gamma ray (disambiguation) =

Gamma rays are a form of electromagnetic radiation.

Gamma Ray may also refer to:

== Music ==
- Gamma Ray (band), a German power metal band
- Gamma Ray (EP), by Queens of the Stone Age
- "Gamma Ray" (song), by Beck
- "Gamma Ray", a song by the German progressive rock band Birth Control
- "Gamma Ray", a song by Circa Zero from the album Circus Hero

== See also ==
- Gama (disambiguation)
- Gamma (disambiguation)
