= Gramm =

Gramm may refer to:

- Gramm (record label), Icelandic record label
- Gramm (surname)
- Gramm, a.k.a. Jan Jelinek, German musician
- Gramm, Wyoming, an unincorporated community

== See also ==
- Gramm–Leach–Bliley Act, an Act of the United States Congress
- Gramm-Latta Budget, a bill passed by the United States Congress
- Graham (disambiguation)
- Gram (disambiguation)
- Grammy Award
