= Estêvão da Gama =

Estêvão da Gama may refer to:

- Estêvão da Gama (15th century), father of Vasco da Gama
- Estêvão da Gama (16th century), son of Vasco da Gama
- Estêvão da Gama (c. 1470), cousin of Vasco da Gama

== See also ==
- Da Gama (disambiguation)
- Gama (disambiguation)
