= Gama =

Gama or Da Gama may refer to:

== Arts and entertainment ==
- Gama (EP), a 2005 EP by The Gazette
- Gama (Naruto), a character in the anime Naruto

== Companies and organizations ==
- Gama Aviation, a company based in the United Kingdom
- Gama Toys, a German tinplate and diecast toy manufacturer
- GAMA Industry, a Turkish construction company
- Game Manufacturers Association, a non-profit trade association
- Gaussin Macnica Mobility, a French autonomous vehicle manufacturer previously known as Navya SAS
- General Aviation Manufacturers Association, non-profit trade association
- Sociedade Esportiva do Gama, Brazilian football club

== People ==
- Gama (surname), for people with the surname Gama
- Gama Singh (born 1954), Canadian wrestler
- The Great Gama (1882–1960), wrestler from Punjab

== Places ==
- Gama, Federal District, in Brazil
- Gama, Burkina Faso
- Gama, Cundinamarca, in Colombia
- Gama, Senegal
- Gama, Guinea
- Gama Rural LLG, in Papua New Guinea
- Da Gama Park, a town in City of Cape Town Metropolitan Municipality, South Africa

== Other ==
- Gama (carriage), a traditional Korean litter
- Gama Goat, a semi-amphibious off-road vehicle
- GAMA Platform, a scientific platform for building spatially explicit agent-based simulations
- Da Gama Dam, a dam on the Witwaters River, South Africa
- Buttumak, a traditional Korean kitchen stove
- Galaxy And Mass Assembly survey, a galaxy survey of data from a number of astronomical instruments
- Groundwater Ambient Monitoring and Assessment Program
- gAMA, an ancillary chunk in the PNG image file format

== See also ==
- Vasco da Gama (disambiguation)
- Gamma (disambiguation)
- Gam (disambiguation)
- Gram (disambiguation)
- Grama (disambiguation)
