= Tim McKnight =

Timothy Eric McKnight is an American biologist. He has been a key developer of a cell transfecting method using vertically aligned carbon nanofibers. Arrays of vertically aligned carbon nanofibers are modified with DNA and pressed into cells and tissue. Surviving cells can express DNA that is delivered during the penetration event, even when the DNA is covalently bound to the penetrant nanofiber element. This gene delivery technique has been termed Impalefection.

== Selected publications ==
- McKnight, Timothy E; Melechko, Anatoli V; Griffin, Guy D; Guillorn, Michael A; Merkulov, Vladimir I; et al. (2003-04-09). "Intracellular integration of synthetic nanostructures with viable cells for controlled biochemical manipulation" (PDF). Nanotechnology. 14 (5). IOP Publishing: 551–556. doi:10.1088/0957-4484/14/5/313. ISSN 0957-4484.
- McKnight, Timothy E.; Melechko, Anatoli V.; Hensley, Dale K.; Mann, David G. J.; Griffin, Guy D.; Simpson, Michael L. (2004). "Tracking Gene Expression after DNA Delivery Using Spatially Indexed Nanofiber Arrays". Nano Letters. 4 (7). American Chemical Society (ACS): 1213–1219. doi:10.1021/nl049504b. ISSN 1530-6984.
