= Theppakulathuparai =

- village
- Country: India
- State: Tamil Nadu
- District: Coimbatore

Languages
  - Official: Tamil
- Time zone: UTC+5:30 (IST)

Theppakulathuparai (abbreviated: T.K.Parai) is a small village which is part of the Thirumalayampalayam town panchayat under the Coimbatore district in the Indian state of Tamil Nadu. As the name suggests it has rocky areas (parai). It is close to the Kerala border and enjoys a pleasant climate throughout the year. It is a village with less than 50 houses and only two small grocery stores selling essentials.

== Occupation ==
Agriculture is the predominant occupation in these parts and Goundar landlords own lands here. Coconut trees can be seen everywhere and crops like tomato, brinjal and grams are grown.

== Cuisine ==
The cuisine is Tamilian with some Keralan influence in its very liberal use of coconut in its dishes.

== Transport ==
=== By Bus ===
Two metropolitan bus lines, 101 and 101B, run between Coimbatore and Theppakulathuparai.

=== Nearest Airport and Railway Station ===
The nearest airport and railway stations are the Coimbatore International Airport and Station.

== Religion ==
There are 2 marathadi [Under the Tree] Vinayagars. There is also the Sembhakaliyamman temple and Lord Murugan Temple close by at walking distance.

== Education ==
The Amrita Institute of Technology is just 15 mins away. The Nehru College is 10 mins away. St Anns Matriculation Higher Secondary School is 10 mins away.

== House Structures ==
Houses in this village is not all concrete and paint rather it has stone walls painted in chunnambu and wood roofs lined with odu (clay tiles). The floors are again mostly challi (a mixture of sand and ground stones) which are wiped with Chaani (cow dung) water. Lately people are building modern houses with concrete roofs and tiled floors.

== Festivals Of Importance ==
The below festivals are celebrated here with Pongal

=== Pongal ===
Pongal is celebrated as a 4-day festival here is Theppakulathuparai, consisting of: Bohi, Thai Pongal, Maatu Pongal, and Poo knowmbi.

==== Preparations for Pongal ====
The house is whitewashed and cleaned and floors wiped in preparation for Pongal. The ponga paanai's are taken out and washed and kept ready. Fresh raw rice is brought from the market as this is what should be used to prepare pongal. The village women folk get together and make snacks like murukku, tatta vadai, laddu etc.. overnight in large quantities. These days due to increased urbanisation the custom of preparing snacks is slowly dying.

==== Bohi ====
The first day would be bohi where villages bring mango leaves and tie them in patterns Mango leaves thoranam and hang them as garlands in every door. They also bring komayam (urine of cows - considered to be sacred to Hindus) and bless the house. They also do something called karai [pronounced kaarai] kattrathu which involves drawing a visible line at the bottom of walls with a red chunnambu (limestone used to paint walls) like liquid.

==== Thai Pongal ====
On the second day the villagers wake up early in the morning, prepare sweet pongal and present it to Vinayagar. The women folk also prepare idli and sambhar and poriyal in large quantities and share it with the people working on their farms and others. They also share the snacks that has been made.

==== Maatu Pongal ====
On the next day, Maatu Pongal, L-shaped coconut leaf partitions like a house with only 2 sides of walls are constructed in the farm land with stones laid out [makeshift stoves] for Ponga paanai's [Clay and aluminium pots] within. Also they bathe the livestock and keep firewood ready to prepare pongal. The women start preparing the kollu kolambu the prior eve as this dish requires a lot of cooking time.

An auspicious time in the evening is noted down from the calendar for that day. This is the time when the village folk will start out with the utensils and food to the farm where these L-shaped structures are present and they will complete pongal celebrations within that time. Meanwhile, the women folk prepare the pongal cuisine which includes kollu kolambu, kollu rasam, poosanikai poriyal, carrot beans and cabbage poriyal etc. in large quantities. They also prepare maavu which is a mixture of rice flour and jaggery. They make 2 big balls of it and place it in a bowl. they make small pits on top and use it as earthen lamps. Further, they decorate the bowl with sticks where flowers are hooked. This is the maavilaku.

At the auspicious time, the farm hands arrive to take the utensils, food and rice in koodai's to the farm. They first head to the vinayagar temple and offer the fresh raw rice to the god and perform prayers. When they reach the farm they lay out the ponga paanai's on the makeshift stoves. The number of pongals made[pots] would depend on the number of gods. People make up to 12+ pongals, one for each god. There would be pongals for kulatheivam, farm animals and so on. This is basically to pray to gods to look after their farm and livestock. The pots are filled with rice and water and firewood laid out. Then a karpooram is lit and fire started to prepare pongals. When the first pongal drops village folk shout pongalo pongal and check the consistency of the mixture that had overflowed. They measure the success of the year with this consistency. If it too diluted then it means there will be some tears that year.

On the outer side of one of the L-shaped wall a small theppakulam will be created with cow dung mixture and filled with coconut water and flowers. On the banks of the theppakulam will rest the 9 kannimars which are 9 triangle shaped stones washed in turmeric water and blessed. Thiruneer, santhanam and kungkum is kept for these kannimars and a new towel, long aloe vera shoots and coconut is offered. Also small earthen lanterns are lit and set in the four banks.

Once all the pongals are ready, they are lined up and prayers offered. Then there is the ceremony of the maavilakku, where the eldest in the family, if a girl should not have come of age or else the boy carries the maavilakku around the L-shaped structure 3 times and shout 'Arakaro Arakaro' while an old man sings a song. After the prayers, the livestock is fed pongal. It is their turn now to walk thru the theppakulam. The theppakulam wall can is split to make space and a thoranam is hung between the partition. Then the cow is made to stand on one side and people beat plates with spoon behind making the cow walk across the theppakulam. This is repeated from the other side as well after which it is taken to the sheds.

The ceremony is now officially over, and a bonfire is made and people sit around to eat a meal in its light. Everyone including the landlords and the farm hands and children sit down on the soil together to have the meal while the women folk serve. After the men and children are done, the women folk sit down to have food after which they distribute food and load the bullock cart with the vessels to take home. While the bullock carts move forward, the people walk behind in the moonlight amidst conversation.

==== Poo Pongal ====
The next day is the poo knowmbi when the unmarried girls in the family wake up early and go around gathering flowers and visiting the ganesh temples and offering prayers. Towards mid-morning the villagers with the family go to the maalaikovil[temple] and offer prayers. They also enjoy the fair setup around the temple and come home in the evening. Mothers make a special pongal for their daughters in the evening outside their house for their welfare. Thus ends the pongal celebrations of the Theppakulathuparai villagers.

=== Diwali ===
Fire Crackers are brought along with new clothes. On the diwali day, the village barber goes around waking up people early in the morning and to get them ready to go to the temple. Each household goes to the nearby ganesh temple and offers pongal and burst crackers. All these are done before the sun rises. Then the women folk make food to share with the rest of the villagers. The kids and younger folk continue celebrating the day by bursting crackers.

=== Saraswati Pooja and Ayutha Pooja ===
This festival is celebrated for 2 days. The first day is when the picture of Goddess Saraswathi, the Goddess of knowledge is brought down cleaned and hoisted on the table. Then she is decorated with flower garlands and plantain shoots. Maavilai thoranams are also tied across doors. Sundal, ellu urundai, Pori are made ready for the evening pooja. All books are taken out and anointed with Thiruneer, Santhanam and Kungkum. They are laid in the front of the goddess. In the evening at an auspicious time, prayers are offered and sweets and sundal distributed. The books are left for the night and taken only the next morning.

The next day is ayutha pooja where all vehicles and bullock carts are painted in thiruneer. Also the horns of animals are painted as well. Prayers are offered.

=== Other festivals ===
- Adi
- Sankaranti
- Chitiraikani
