= Gams (disambiguation) =

Gams is a municipality of Switzerland.

Gams may also refer to:

== Acronyms ==
- General Algebraic Modeling System (GAMS), a mathematical optimization computer program
- Guide to Available Mathematical Software (GAMS), a project of the National Institute of Standards and Technology
- Graduate of Ayurvedic Medicine and Surgery (GAMS), a degree in Ayurvedic Medicine and Surgery nowadays called BAMS (Bachelor's degree in Ayurvedic Medicine and surgery)

== Places ==
- Bad Gams, a municipality of Austria
- Gams bei Hieflau, a municipality of Austria
- Gams, German name for Kamnica, Maribor, a village northwest of Maribor, Slovenia

== People ==
- Helmut Gams, known by the author abbreviation "Gams"
- Pius Bonifacius Gams, ecclesiastical historian

== Music ==
- "Gams", a song by the Cincinnati blues-rock group The Bronx Kill

== Other ==
- plural of Gam (nautical term), a social meeting between ships at sea
