= ION LMD =

- Acronym: ION LMD means Image Oriented Navigation Laser Microdissection Device
- Uses: Isolation and collection of single cell or cells by laser cutting for further genetic analysis
- Notable experiments: Choi JW, Kim DG, Lee AE, Kim HR, Lee JY, et al. (2011) Cancer-Associated Splicing Variant of Tumor Suppressor AIMP2/p38: Pathological Implication in Tumorigenesis. PLoS Genet 7(3): e1001351. doi:10.1371/journal.pgen.1001351 Cao Z, Song JH, Kang YW, Yoon JH, Nam SW, et al. (2010) Genetic and Expression Analysis of the SIRT1 Gene in Gastric Cancers. J Gastric Cancer 10(3): 91-98. Cho YG, Song JH, Kim CJ, Lee YS, Kim SY, et al. (2007) Genetic alterations of the ATBF1 gene in gastric cancer. Cli Cancer Res 13(15): 4355-9.
- Manufacturer: JungWoo F&B
- Model: ION LMD G1, ION LMD G2, ION LMD Pro

ION LMD system is one of the laser microdissection systems and a name of device that follows Gravity-Assisted Microdissection method, also known as GAM method. This non-contact laser microdissection system makes cell isolation for further genetic analysis possible. It is the first developed laser microdissection system in Asia.

== History ==
At first, proto type of ION LMD system was developed in 2004.
The first generation of ION LMD was developed in 2005 and then the second generation(so-called G2) was developed in 2008. At last, the third generation(so-called ION LMD Pro) was developed in 2012.

== Manufacturer ==
JungWoo F&B was founded in 1994, and offers various factory automation products for clients in semiconductor, consumer electronics, LCD, automotive manufacturing and ship-building industries. In 2003, the company entered the bio-mechanics business for the medical laboratory market and developed an ION LMD system which is utilized in cancer research.

== Awards ==
This ION LMD system has won some awards.

- 2005 Excellent Machine by Ministry of Commerce, Industry and Energy, Republic of Korea
- 2005 Best Medical Device by Korean Medical Association
- 2006 New Excellent Product by Ministry of Commerce, Industry and Energy, Republic of Korea
