= Impalefection =

Impalefection is a method of gene delivery using nanomaterials, such as carbon nanofibers, carbon nanotubes, nanowires. Needle-like nanostructures are synthesized perpendicular to the surface of a substrate. Plasmid DNA containing the gene, and intended for intracellular delivery, is attached to the nanostructure surface. A chip with arrays of these needles is then pressed against cells or tissue. Cells that are impaled by nanostructures can express the delivered gene(s).

As one of the types of transfection, the term is derived from two words – impalement and infection.

== Applications ==
One of the features of impalefection is spatially resolved gene delivery that holds potential for such tissue engineering approaches in wound healing as gene activated matrix technology. Though impalefection is an efficient approach in vitro, it has not yet been effectively used in vivo on live organisms and tissues.

== Carrier materials ==
Vertically aligned carbon nanofiber arrays prepared by photolithography and plasma enhanced chemical vapor deposition are one of the suitable types of material. Silicon nanowires are another choice of nanoneedles that have been utilized for impalefection.

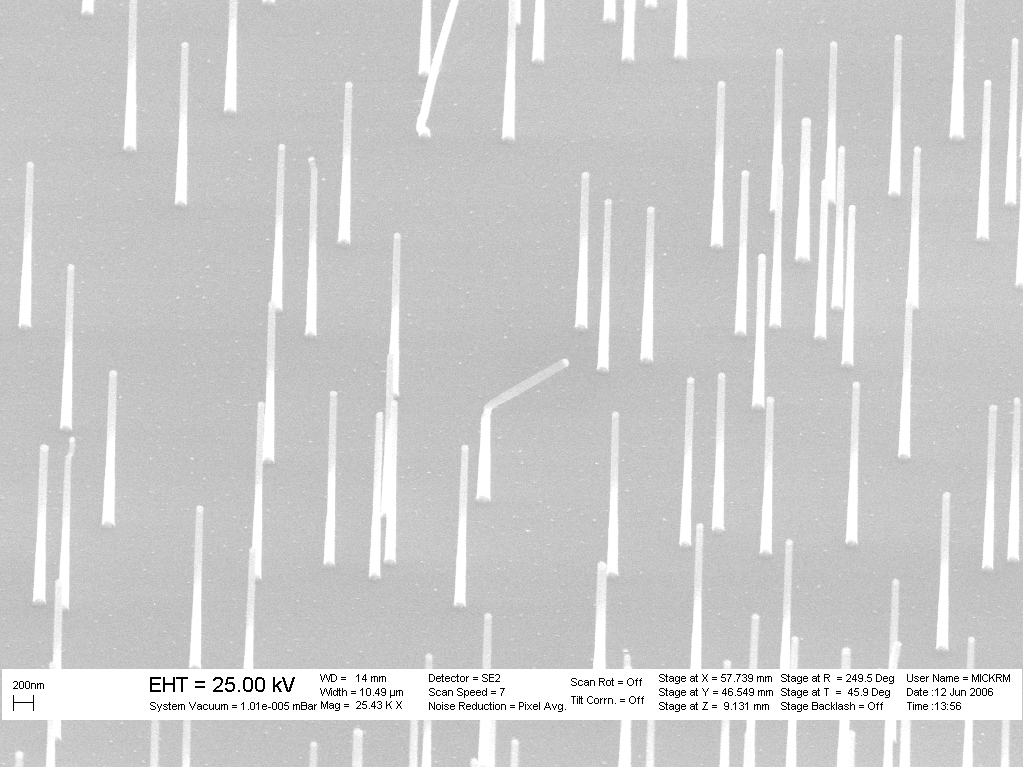
An SEM image of epitaxial nanowire heterostructures grown from catalytic gold nanoparticles.

== See also ==
- Nanomedicine
- Tim McKnight
