= Vasco da Gama (disambiguation) =

Vasco da Gama (c. 1460s–1524) was a Portuguese explorer.

Vasco da Gama may also refer to:

== Places ==
- Vasco da Gama, Goa, India
  - Vasco da Gama railway station
- Vasco da Gama (crater), lunar crater
- Vasco da Gama, Rio de Janeiro, Brazil

== Ships ==
- Vasco da Gama-class frigate, class of frigates of the Portuguese Navy, including,
  - NRP Vasco da Gama (F330)
- Portuguese ironclad Vasco da Gama 1876–1936, ironclad and later cruiser of the Portuguese Navy
- CMA CGM Vasco de Gama, a container ship
- Vasco da Gama (cruise ship)

== Sports clubs ==
- CR Vasco da Gama, a sports club from Rio de Janeiro, Brazil
  - CR Vasco da Gama (women)
  - CR Vasco da Gama (basketball)
  - CR Vasco da Gama (beach soccer)
- Associação Desportiva Vasco da Gama, a football club from Rio Branco, Brazil
- C.F. Vasco da Gama Vidigueira, a football club from Vidigueira, Portugal
- Vasco SC, a football club from Goa, India
- NITEL Vasco Da Gama F.C., a football club from Enugu, Nigeria
- Vasco da Gama (South Africa), a football club from Cape Town
- Bridgeport Vasco da Gama, a soccer club from Bridgeport, Connecticut, United States

== Structures ==
- Vasco da Gama Bridge, near Lisbon, Portugal
- Vasco da Gama Tower, Lisbon, Portugal

== Other uses ==
- Vasco da Gama (politician) (born 1959), South African politician
- L'Africaine, an opera by Meyerbeer with the working title Vasco de Gama [sic], published in a critical edition by Ricordi in 2018 under that latter name

== See also ==
- Vasco da Gama station (disambiguation)
- Vascodigama, a Kannada film
