= Carbon nanofiber =

Structured carbon fibers

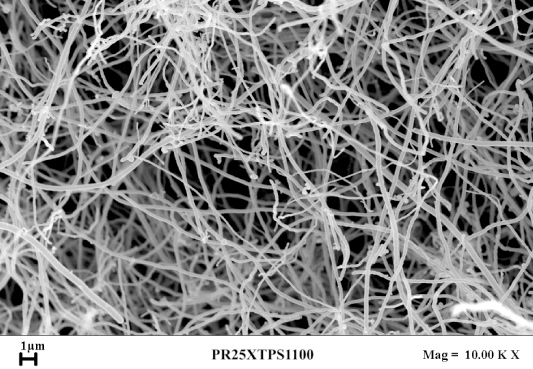
Regular carbon nanofibers.

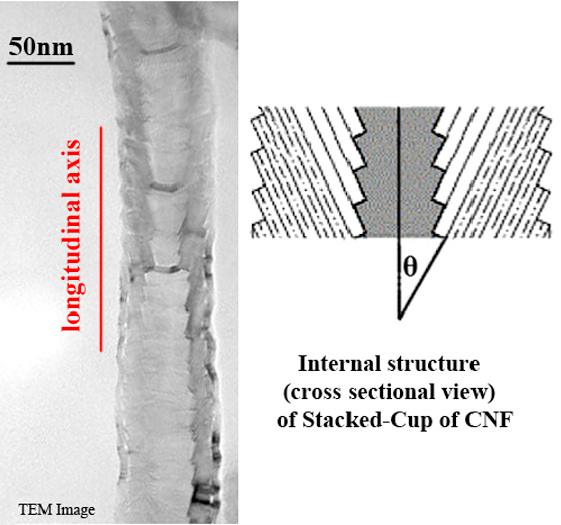
Stacked-cup carbon nanofiber: electron micrograph (left) and model (right).

Carbon nanofibers (CNFs), vapor grown carbon fibers (VGCFs), or vapor grown carbon nanofibers (VGCNFs) are cylindrical nanostructures with graphene layers arranged as stacked cones, cups or plates. Carbon nanofibers with graphene layers wrapped into perfect cylinders are called carbon nanotubes.

== Introduction ==
Carbon has a high level of chemical bonding flexibility, which lends itself to the formation of a number of stable Organic and Inorganic Molecules. Elemental carbon has a number of allotropes(variants) including diamond, graphite, and fullerenes. Though they all consist of elemental carbon, their properties vary widely. This underscores the versatility of CNFs, which are notable for their thermal, electrical, electromagnetic shielding, and mechanical property enhancements. As carbon is readily available at low cost, CNFs are popular additives to composite materials. CNFs are very small, existing at the nanometer scale. An atom is between .1-.5 nm, thus specialized microscopic techniques such as scanning tunneling microscopy and atomic force microscopy are required to examine the properties of CNFs.

== Synthesis ==
Catalytic chemical vapor deposition (CCVD) or simply CVD with variants like thermal and plasma-assisted is the dominant commercial technique for the fabrication of VGCF and VGCNF. Here, gas-phase molecules are decomposed at high temperatures and carbon is deposited in the presence of a transition metal catalyst on a substrate where subsequent growth of the fiber around the catalyst particles is realized. In general, this process involves separate stages such as gas decomposition, carbon deposition, fiber growth, fiber thickening, graphitization, and purification and results in hollow fibers. The nanofiber diameter depends on the catalyst size. The CVD process for the fabrication of VGCF generally falls into two categories: 1) fixed-catalyst process (batch), and 2) floating-catalyst process (continuous).

In the batch process developed by Tibbetts, a mixture of hydrocarbon/hydrogen/helium was passed over a mullite (crystalline aluminum silicate) with fine iron catalyst particle deposits maintained at 1000 °C. The hydrocarbon used was methane in the concentration of 15% by volume. Fiber growth in several centimeters was achieved in just 10 minutes with a gas residence time of 20 seconds. In general, fiber length can be controlled by the gas residence time in the reactor. Gravity and direction of the gas flow typically affects the direction of the fiber growth.

The continuous or floating-catalyst process was patented earlier by Koyama and Endo and was later modified by Hatano and coworkers. This process typically yields VGCF with sub-micrometre diameters and lengths of a few to 100 μm, which accords with the definition of carbon nanofibers. They utilized organometallic compounds dissolved in a volatile solvent like benzene that would yield a mixture of ultrafine catalyst particles (5–25 nm in diameter) in hydrocarbon gas as the temperature rose to 1100 °C. In the furnace, the fiber growth initiates on the surface of the catalyst particles and continues until catalyst poisoning occurs by impurities in the system. In the fiber growth mechanism described by Baker and coworkers, only the part of catalyst particle exposed to the gas mixture contributes to the fiber growth and the growth stops as soon as the exposed part is covered, i.e. the catalyst is poisoned. The catalyst particle remains buried in the growth tip of the fiber at a final concentration of about a few parts per million. At this stage, fiber thickening takes place.

The most commonly used catalyst is iron, often treated with sulfur, hydrogen sulfide, etc. to lower the melting point and facilitate its penetration into the pores of carbon and hence, to produce more growth sites. Fe/Ni, Ni, Co, Mn, Cu, V, Cr, Mo, Pd, MgO, and Al_{2}O_{3} are also used as catalyst. Acetylene, ethylene, methane, natural gas, and benzene are the most commonly used carbonaceous gases. Often carbon monoxide (CO) is introduced in the gas flow to increase the carbon yield through reduction of possible iron oxides in the system.

In 2017, a research group in Tsinghua University reported the epytixial growth of aligned, continuous, catalyst-free carbon nanofiber from a carbon nanotube template. The fabrication process includes thickening of continuous carbon nanotube films by gas-phase pyrolytic carbon deposition and further graphitization of the carbon layer by high temperature treatment. Due to the epitaxial growth mechanism, the fiber features superior properties including low density, high mechanical strength, high electrical conductivity, high thermal conductivity.

== Safety ==
In the United States, the Occupational Safety and Health Act of 1970 was a driving force behind many of the changes made regarding safety in the workplace over the last few decades. One small group of the numerous substances to be regulated by this act is carbon nanofibers (CNF). While still an active area of research, there have been studies conducted that indicate health risks associated with carbon nanotubes (CNT) and CNF that pose greater hazards than their bulk counterparts. One of the primary hazards of concern associated with CNT and CNF is respiratory damage such as pulmonary inflammation, granuloma, and fibrosis. However, these findings were observed in mice, and that it is currently unknown whether the same effects would be observed in humans. Nonetheless, these studies have given cause for an attempt to minimize exposure to these nanoparticles.

A separate study conducted prior to the 2013 annual Society of Toxicology meeting aimed to identify potential carcinogenic effects associated with multi-walled carbon nanotubes (MWCNT). The findings indicated that, in the presence of an initiator chemical, the MWCNTs caused a much greater incidence of tumors in mice. There was no indication of increased presence of tumors in the absence of the initiator chemical, however. Further studies are needed for this scenario.

One of the major hurdles in identifying hazards associated with CNF is the diversity of fibers that exist. Some of the contributing factors to this diversity include shape, size, and chemical composition. One exposure standard (2015) states that the acceptable limit for CNT and CNF exposure is 1 μg/m^{3} of respirable size fraction elemental carbon (8-hour time-weighted average). This standard was based on information gathered from 14 sites whose samples were analyzed by transmission electron microscopy (TEM).

A recent safety data sheet (SDS) for CNF (revised in 2016) lists the nanofibers as an eye irritant, and states that they have single exposure respiratory system organ toxicity. Smaller CNF possess a greater potential for forming dust clouds when handling. As such, great care must be taken when handling CNF. The recommended personal protective equipment (PPE) for handling CNF includes nitrile gloves, particle respirators, and nanomaterial-impervious clothing (dependent on workplace conditions). In addition to exposure controls while working with the CNF, safe storage conditions are also important in minimizing the risk associated with CNF. Safe CNF storage entails storing the fibers away from oxidizing agents and open flames. Under fire conditions, CNF form hazardous decomposition products though the exact nature of these decomposition products is not currently known. Apart from carcinogenicity and organ toxicity, toxicological data for CNF is currently rather limited.

== Applications ==
- Researchers are using nanofibers to deliver therapeutic drugs. They have developed an elastic material that is embedded with needle like carbon nanofibers. The material is intended to be used as balloons which are inserted next to diseased tissue, and then inflated. When the balloon is inflated, the carbon nanofibers penetrate diseased cells and deliver therapeutic drugs. Researchers at MIT have used carbon nanofibers to make lithium-ion battery electrodes that show four times the storage capacity of current lithium ion batteries. Researchers are using nanofibers to make sensors that change color as they absorb chemical vapors. They plan to use these sensors to show when the absorbing material in a gas mask becomes saturated.
- The unique structure of these porous carbon nanofibers resulted in good electrochemical performance such as high reversible capacity and good cycle stability when they were used as anodes for rechargeable lithium-ion batteries.
- Further market development will depend on material availability at reasonable prices. We have achieved bulk production capacities of high purity carbon nanofibers (CNFs) at low cost by a catalytic chemical vapor deposition (CCVD) process.
- Unlike catalytic synthesis, electrospinning polyacrylonitrile (PAN) followed by stabilization and carbonization has become a straightforward and convenient route to make continuous carbon nanofibers.
- Field electron emission sources
  - Field electron emission (also known as field emission (FE) and electron field emission) is emission of electrons induced by an electrostatic field. The most common context is field emission from a solid surface into vacuum. However, field emission can take place from solid or liquid surfaces, into vacuum, air, a fluid, or any non-conducting or weakly conducting dielectric. The field-induced promotion of electrons from the valence to conduction band of semiconductors (the Zener effect) can also be regarded as a form of field emission.
- Composite materials
- Scanning probe microscopy tips
  - Scanning probe microscopy (SPM) is a branch of microscopy that forms images of surfaces using a physical probe that scans the specimen.
- Carrier material for various catalysts in petrochemistry
- In vertically aligned arrays, a platform for gene delivery. (See Impalefection)
  - Impalefection is a method of gene delivery using nanomaterials, such as carbon nanofibers, carbon nanotubes, nanowires. Needle-like nanostructures are synthesized perpendicular to the surface of a substrate. Plasmid DNA containing the gene, intended for intracellular delivery, is attached to the nanostructure surface. A chip with arrays of these needles is then pressed against cells or tissue. Cells that are impaled by nanostructures can express the delivered gene(s).
- For electrode materials
- Oil spill remediation
  - Oil spill remediation: The process for the manufacture of a carbon-carbon-composite material comprises the steps of treating a carbonaceous carrier material with a metal-containing catalyst material. The metal is capable of forming nanosize carbon structures, and growing nanosize carbon structures by means of a chemical vapor deposition method on the treated carrier in a gas atmosphere comprising a carbon-containing gas, followed by an optional surface modification step. This process allows optimizing porosity, hydrodynamical properties and surface chemistry independently from each other, which is particularly beneficial in respect of the use of the composite for water purification. Carbon black-based composites are particularly useful for filler applications.

== History ==
One of the first technical records concerning carbon nanofibers is probably a patent dated 1889 on synthesis of filamentous carbon by Hughes and Chambers. They utilized a methane/hydrogen gaseous mixture and grew carbon filaments through gas pyrolysis and subsequent carbon deposition and filament growth. The true appreciation of these fibers, however, came much later when their structure could be analyzed by electron microscopy. The first electron microscopy observations of carbon nanofibers were performed in the early 1950s by the Soviet scientists Radushkevich and Lukyanovich, who published a paper in the Soviet Journal of Physical Chemistry showing hollow graphitic carbon fibers that are 50 nanometers in diameter. Early in the 1970s, Japanese researchers Morinobu Endo, now the director of the Institute of Carbon Science and Technology at Shinshu University, reported the discovery of carbon nanofibers, including that some were shaped as hollow tubes. He also succeeded in the manufacturing of VGCF with a diameter of 1 μm and length of above 1 mm. Later, in the early 1980s, Tibbetts in the US and Benissad in France continued to perfect the VGCF fabrication process. In the US, the deeper studies focusing on synthesis and properties of these materials for advanced applications were led by R. Terry K. Baker. They were motivated by the need to inhibit the growth of carbon nanofibers because of the persistent problems caused by accumulation of the material in a variety of commercial processes, especially in the particular field of petroleum processing. In 1991, Japanese researchers Sumio Iijima, while working at NEC, synthesized hollow carbon molecules and determined their crystal structure. The following year, these molecules were called "carbon nanotubes" for the first time. VGCNF is produced through essentially the same manufacturing process as VGCF, only the diameter is typically less than 200 nm. Several companies around the globe are actively involved in the commercial scale production of carbon nanofibers and new engineering applications are being developed for these materials intensively, the latest being a carbon nanofiber bearing porous composite for oil spill remediation.

== See also ==
- Allotropes of carbon
- Carbon nanotubes
- Carbon black
- Carbon nanocone
- Carbon fiber
- Impalefection, a method of cell transfection using carbon nanofibers
