= Laser capture microdissection =

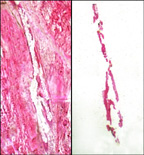
Laser capture micro-dissection transfer of pure breast duct epithelial cells. Left panel shows tissue section with selected cells removed. Right panel shows isolated epithelial cells on transfer film.

Laser capture microdissection (LCM), also called microdissection, laser microdissection (LMD), or laser-assisted microdissection (LMD or LAM), is a method for isolating specific cells of interest from microscopic regions of tissue/cells/organisms (dissection on a microscopic scale with the help of a laser).

== Principle ==
Laser-capture microdissection (LCM) is a method to procure subpopulations of tissue cells under direct microscopic visualization. LCM technology can harvest the cells of interest directly or can isolate specific cells by cutting away unwanted cells to give histologically pure enriched cell populations. A variety of downstream applications exist: DNA genotyping and loss of heterozygosity (LOH) analysis, RNA transcript profiling, cDNA library generation, proteomics discovery and signal-pathway profiling. The total time required to carry out this protocol is typically 1–1.5 h.

== Extraction ==
A laser is coupled into a microscope and focuses onto the tissue on the slide. By movement of the laser by optics or the stage the focus follows a trajectory which is predefined by the user. This trajectory, also called element, is then cut out and separated from the adjacent tissue. After the cutting process, an extraction process has to follow if an extraction process is desired. More recent technologies utilize non-contact microdissection.

There are several ways to extract tissue from a microscope slide with a histopathology sample on it. Press a sticky surface onto the sample and tear out. This extracts the desired region, but can also remove particles or unwanted tissue on the surface, because the surface is not selective. Melt a plastic membrane onto the sample and tear out. The heat is introduced, for example, by a red or infrared (IR) laser onto a membrane stained with an absorbing dye. As this adheres the desired sample onto the membrane, as with any membrane that is put close to the histopathology sample surface, there might be some debris extracted. Another danger is the introduced heat: Some molecules like DNA, RNA, or protein don't allow to be heated too much or at all for the goal of being isolated as purely as possible.

For transport without contact. There are three different approaches. Transport by gravity using an upright microscope (called GAM, gravity-assisted microdissection) or transport by laser pressure catapult; the most recent generation utilizes a technology based on laser induced forward transfer (LIFT). With cut-and-capture, a cap coated with an adhesive is positioned directly on the thinly cut (5-8 μm) tissue section, the section itself resting on a thin membrane (polyethylene naphthalene). An IR laser gently heats the adhesive on the cap fusing it to the underlying tissue and an UV laser cuts through tissue and underlying membrane. The membrane-tissue entity now adheres to the cap and the cells on the cap can be used in downstream applications (DNA, RNA, protein analysis).

== Procedure ==
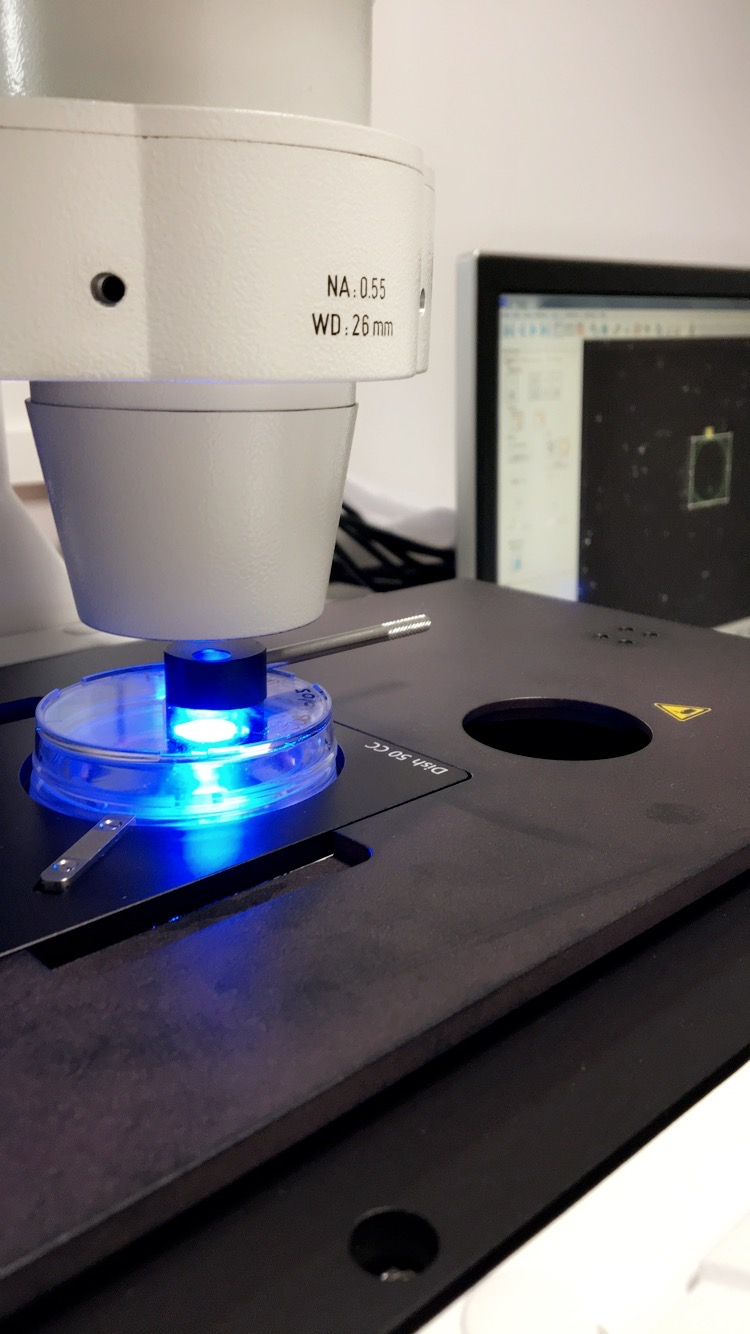
Laser Capture Microdissection

Under a microscope using a software interface, a tissue section (typically 5-50 micrometres thick) is viewed and individual cells or clusters of cells are identified either manually or in semi-automated or more fully automated ways allowing the imaging and then automatic selection of targets for isolation. Currently six primary isolation/collection technologies exist using a microscope and device for cell isolation. Four of these typically use an ultraviolet pulsed laser (355 nm) for the cutting of the tissues directly or the membranes/film, and sometimes in combination with an IR laser responsible for heating/melting a sticky polymer for cellular adhesion and isolation. IR laser provides a more gentle approach to microdissection. A fifth ultraviolet laser based technology uses special slides coated with an energy transfer coating which, when activated by the laser pulse, propels the tissue or cells into a collection cap.

The laser cutting width is usually less than 1 μm, thus the target cells are not affected by the laser beam. Even live cells are not damaged by the laser cutting and are viable after cutting for cloning and reculturing as appropriate.

The various technologies differ in the collection process, possible imaging methods (fluorescence microscopy/bright field microscopy/differential interference contrast microscopy/phase contrast microscopy/ etc.) and the types of holders and tissue preparation needed before the imaging and isolation. Most are primarily dedicated micro-dissection systems, and some can be used as research microscopes as well, only one technology (#2 here, Leica) uses an upright microscope, limiting some of the sample handling capabilities somewhat, especially for live cell work.

The first technology (used by Carl Zeiss PALM) cuts around the sample then collects it by a "catapulting" technology. The sample can be catapulted from a slide or special culture dish by a defocused U.V laser pulse which generates a photonic force to propel the material off the slide/dish, a technique sometimes called Laser Micro-dissection Pressure Catapulting (LMPC). The dissected material is sent upward (up to several millimetres) to a microfuge tube cap or other collector which contains either a buffer or a specialized tacky material in the tube cap that the tissue will adhere to. This active catapulting process avoids some of the static problems when using membrane-coated slides.

Another process follows gravity-assisted microdissection method that turns on gravity to collect samples in tube cap under the slide used (used by ION LMD system, Jungwoo F&B). In case of this system, it moves the motorized stage to cut the cells of interests, keeping the laser beam fixed. And the system uses a 355 nm Solid-state laser(UV-A) which is the safest way to cut the tissues without RNA or DNA damage.

Another closely related LCM process (used by Leica) cuts the sample from above and the sample drops via gravity (gravity-assisted microdissection) into a capture device below the sample. The different point with upper one is, the laser beam here is moving to cut tissue by moving dichroic mirror.

When the cells (on a slide or special culture dish) of choice are in the center of the field of view, the operator selects the cells of interest using instrument software. The area to be isolated when a near-IR laser to activate transfer film on a cap placed on the tissue sample, melting the adhesive which then fuses the film with the underlying cells of choice (see Arcturus systems); and/or by activating a UV laser to cut out the cell of interest. The cells are then lifted off the thin tissue section, leaving all unwanted cells behind. The cells of interest are then viewed and documented prior to extraction.

The fourth UV based technology (used by Molecular Machines and Industries AG) offers a slight difference to the 3rd technology here by essentially creating a sandwich of sorts with slide>sample>and membrane overlying the sample by the use of a frame slide whose membrane surface is cut by the laser and ultimately picked up from above by a special adhesive cap.

A fifth UV based technology uses standard glass slides coated with an inert energy transfer coating and a UV based laser microdissection system (typically a Leica LMD or PALM Zeiss machine). Tissue sections are mounted on top of the energy transfer coating. The energy from a UV laser is converted to kinetic energy upon striking the coating, vaporizing it, instantly propelling selected tissue features into the collection tube. The energy transfer coated slides, commercialized under the trade name DIRECTOR slides by Expression Pathology Inc. (Rockville, MD), offer several advantages for proteomic work. They also do not autofluoresce, so they can be used for applications using fluorescent stains, DIC or polarized light.

In addition to tissue sections, LCM can be performed on living cells/organisms, cell smears, chromosome preparations, and plant tissue.

== Applications ==
The laser capture microdissection process does not alter or damage the morphology and chemistry of the sample collected, nor the surrounding cells. For this reason, LCM is a useful method of collecting selected cells for DNA, RNA and/or protein analyses. LCM has also been used to isolate acellular structures, such as amyloid plaques. LCM can be performed on a variety of tissue samples including blood smears, cytologic preparations, cell cultures and aliquots of solid tissue. Frozen and paraffin embedded archival tissue may also be used.

== Systems ==
As of 2025, there are two major providers of laser-assisted microdissection systems: Leica Microsystems and MMI. Formerly significant providers Zeiss and Arcturus have discontinued their respective systems.

=== Laser Microbeam Microdissection (LMD System, Leica Microsystems) ===
The LMD system couples an upright microscope with a UV laser. Using Laser Microbeam Microdissection (LMD), specific regions of a tissue section, down to single cells or chromosomes — can be excised without contact using a pulsed UV laser. A focused laser beam is guided along the contours of the selected areas. In the Leica LMD system, the dissected material is transported contact-free into a collector by gravity. Various consumables can be used as slide carriers depending on the intended application.

=== MMI System ===
The laser microdissection technology used by Molecular Machines and Industries GmbH (MMI), designed for use with inverted microscopes, is based on a UV laser. Sample preparation involves a "sandwich method," where the sample is positioned between an inert membrane slide and a glass slide. The UV laser precisely cuts out the target area. The isolated sample, along with the membrane, is then lifted by an "adhesive cap" — a sticky lid of the reaction vessel. Since the sample never comes into contact with the adhesive cap due to the sandwich structure, contamination-free sample collection is ensured.

The MMI system supports fully automated sample isolation, which can be performed either with adhesive caps or directly into a 96-well plate. The technology is suitable for single-cell analysis. AI-assisted software can identify individual cells on the slide and then automatically isolate them via laser microdissection.

=== Comparison of the MMI System and Leica Microsystems’ System ===
A comparative study from 2024 examined the collection efficiency of the MMI system versus Leica Microsystems' gravity-based system. The MMI system demonstrated a sample recovery efficiency of 100%, whereas the Leica system showed more frequent sample losses.
