= Gamma (disambiguation) =

Gamma (Γ or γ) is the third letter of the Greek alphabet.

Gamma may also refer to:

== Science and technology ==
=== Computing ===
- Gamma software, a stage in the software release life cycle
- Elias gamma coding, in computer science, encoding, compression
- Gamma (app), a web-based software platform that uses artificial intelligence
- Gamma correction, a nonlinear operation used to encode and decode luminance in video or images

=== Physics and astronomy ===
- Gamma (eclipse), how close to the center of the Earth or Moon an eclipse is
- Gamma (satellite), a Soviet gamma ray telescope launched into orbit in 1990
- GAMMA, a gamma ray experiment conducted in Armenia
- γ, a non-SI unit of magnetic flux density formerly used in geophysics, equal to a nanotesla
- γ, the Bayer designation of the third-brightest star of a constellation

=== Biology and medicine ===
- SARS-CoV-2 Gamma variant, one of the variants of SARS-CoV-2, the virus that causes COVID-19

=== Chemistry and pharmacology ===
- GAMMA (drug), or 3,4-methylenedioxyphenylpropylamine, a psychedelic drug

== Arts and entertainment ==
=== Music ===
- Gamma (band), American rock band
- Gamma chord, a type of musical chord
- Gamma (album), a 2024 album by Gesaffelstein

=== Fictional entities ===
- E-102 Gamma, one of the E-Series robots in the Sonic the Hedgehog franchise
- Gamma Akutabi, a fictional character from the manga Zombiepowder.
- Gamma (ガンマ), an elf character in the light novel and anime series The Eminence in Shadow
- Gamma Jack, a superhero in The Incredibles franchise
- Gamma Metroids, an evolution of the Metroid species from the game Metroid II: Return of Samus
- Gamma Corps, two Marvel Comics fictional military units

=== Other arts and entertainment ===
- Gamma (miniseries), a 1975 Italian television miniseries
- Gamma (wrestler), ring name of Japanese professional wrestler Sugamoto Yoshihito (born 1973)

== Companies ==
- Gamma (store), a Dutch hardware-store chain
- Gamma Group, developers of FinFisher and associated suites of malware
- Gamma (agency), a French photo agency
- Gamma (media company), founded in 2023
- Gamma Communications, a UK-based telecommunications business

== Places ==
- Gamma, Missouri, United States, an unincorporated community
- Gamma Peak, Washington state, United States, a mountain
- Gamma Island (Greenland)

== Transportation ==
- General Motors Gamma platform, a subcompact automobile platform
- Lancia Gamma, an executive coupe
- Hyundai Gamma engine, a family of 1.6 L gasoline inline-4 engines
- Suzuki RG250 Gamma, a two-stroke motorcycle
- Northrop Gamma, a 1930s cargo plane
- Bristol Siddeley Gamma, a family of British rocket engines
- Firefly Gamma, a concept for a two-stage-to-orbit partially reusable rocket

== Other uses ==
- Tropical Storm Gamma (2005), that made landfall in Honduras
- Hurricane Gamma, that made landfall on the Yucatán Peninsula in 2020
- Gamma FC, a defunct football club based in Budafok, Hungary
- Gamma (finance) (Γ), a second order derivative of an option pricing formula
- Gamma, a Globalization and World Cities Research Network city categorization
- Gamma, a classification of sensitive compartmented information
- Groupe des Architectes Modernes Marocains, an architecture collective in Morocco

== See also ==
- Gamma Ethniki, a third-tier Greek football league
- Gamma matrices, in mathematical physics
- Gamma wave, a type of brain wave
- Gamma ray (disambiguation)
- Gama (disambiguation)
- Grama (disambiguation)
