= Morinobu Endo =

Japanese physicist and chemist

遠藤守信 Morinobu Endo
- Born: 1946 (age 79–80)
- Education: Shinshu University
- Known for: High resolution carbon nanofibers and Carbon nanotubes
- Awards: See below.
- Scientific career
- Fields: Nanotechnology

Morinobu Endo (遠藤 守信 Endō Morinobu, born September 28, 1946) is a Japanese physicist and chemist, often cited as one of the pioneers of carbon nanofibers and carbon nanotubes synthesis at the beginning of the 1970s. He demonstrated carbon fibers can be grown by gas pyrolysis and traveled to Orléans, France in 1974 working with Madame Agnès Oberlin at CNRS in her laboratory. He discovered carbon nanotubes in 1976 as part of his studies at University of Orleans in France. He has been awarded the Charles E. Pettinos Award from the American Carbon Society in 2001, "For his pioneering work and applications of carbon nanotubes", Medal of Achievement in Carbon Science and Technology from the American Carbon Society in 2004, "for the discovery of, and early synthesis work on, carbon nanotubes".

Born in Nagano Prefecture in 1946, he studied electrical engineering and received his Bachelor of Engineering and master's degree in 1969 and 1971 from Shinshu University, Japan, respectively, and obtained "Docteur d'Universite" in 1975 from University of Orléans, France, then Ph.D. in 1978 from Nagoya University, Japan.

In his works, he developed the structural, synthetic research as well as physical properties analysis, mainly on multi-walled carbon nanotubes. He showed that they had a tubular structure of graphite layers grown by ultra-fine iron particle by catalytic process, and developed to mass production process for the first time. This catalytic CVD process has been used as an industrially available mass production method, both substrate and floating catalyst processes. Present CCVD process has been expecting to grow the wide range of carbon nanotubes by controlling the growth site as well as their nanostructure.

His main research interests are science and applications of "nanocarbons" such as carbon nanotubes, and he has contributed to development of new composites and high-performance energy storage devices such as lithium ion battery, electric double layer capacitor, and fuel cell, based on such structure controlled advanced carbons.

Since 1990, he is a professor of education and training of electrical and electronics engineers, and now is also the director of Institute of Carbon Science & Technology, both at Shinshu University. He is one of the international advisory members of CARBON journal. He has been invited at many international conferences and symposium as a plenary lecturer/key-note speaker. In addition, he has joined many international conferences as a chairman, organizer and advisory board member.

== Research fields ==
- Carbon science and applications of novel carbon materials, including nanocarbons.

== Professional record ==
- 1974–1975, CNRS, France (visiting research fellow)
- 1972– , Shinshu University Faculty of Engineering (assistant)
- 1977– , Shinshu University Faculty of Engineering (lecturer)
- 1978– , Shinshu University Faculty of Engineering (associate professor)
- 1982– , MIT, America (visiting research fellow)
- 1990– , Shinshu University Faculty of Engineering (professor)
- 1993–1994, Cooperative Research Center, Shinshu University (head)
- 2004–2011, The Carbon Society of Japan (chairman)
- 2005–2012, Institute of Carbon Science & Technology, Shinshu University (head)
- 2012– , Institute of Carbon Science & Technology, Shinshu University (director)

== Academy ==
- The Institute of Electrical Engineers of Japan
- The Japan Society of Applied Physics
- The Carbon Society of Japan
- Institute of Electronics, Information and Communication Engineers
- MRS
- American Carbon Society

== Recognition ==
- 1995, Carbon Society of Japan award (The Carbon Society of Japan)
- 2001, Charles E. Pettinos Award (American Carbon Society)
- 2003, Shinmai Prize (Shinmai Culture Foundation)
- 2003, Ishikawa Award (Ishikawa Carbon Science Technology Promotion Foundation)
- 2004, Medal of Achievement in Carbon Science and Technology (American Carbon Society)
- 2007, Prize for Science and Technology (Research Category), the Commendation for Science and Technology (Ministry of Education, Culture, Sports, Science and Technology)
- 2007, Commendation by the Governor of Nagano Prefecture for Industrial and Commercial Achievements (Nagano Prefecture)
- 2007, Special Lectureship Award at Annual Meeting on Photochemistry, 2007 (The Japanese Photochemistry Association)
- 2008, Chunichi Culture Award (Chunichi Shimbun)
- 2008, Medal with Purple Ribbon (Government of Japan)
- 2009, The International Union of Materials Research Societies (IUMRS) Somiya Award (The International Union of Materials Research Societies, USA)
- 2010, Alice Hamilton Awards for Occupational Safety and Health (The National Institute for Occupational Safety and Health (NIOSH), USA), Biological Science Category
- 2012, International Ceramics Prize 2012
- 2012, NANOSMAT Prize 2012
- and others
