= Grams (disambiguation) =

Grams is the plural of "gram", a unit of mass.

Grams may also refer to:

== People ==
- Martin Grams Jr. (born 1977), American pop culture historian
- Natalie Grams (born 1978), German physician, author and former homeopath who now criticizes the pseudoscience
- Oleg Grams (born 1984), Russian handball player
- Rod Grams (1948–2013), American politician
- Wolfgang Grams (1953–1993), a member of the Red Army Faction terrorist group

== Other uses ==
- Grams (search), a discontinued darknet search engine

== See also ==
- Gram (disambiguation)
