= Placetel =

German company

Gamma Placetel GmbH
- Company type: GmbH
- Founded: 2007; 19 years ago
- Headquarters: Cologne, Germany
- Key people: Peter Kurt Nowack; Gerben Wijbenga
- Services: Cloud communications
- Website: placetel.de

Placetel is a German provider of cloud communication technologies based in Cologne.

== Products and services ==
Placetel provides cloud-based telephone and communication technologies and systems, particularly cloud telephony, unified communications, and online collaboration tools for corporate use. The company primarily offers its own Webex-based UCaaS product, which include a comprehensive collaboration suite that integrates various team communication technologies into one application. Its VoIP-based phone system includes over 150 business functions, such as video conferencing, chat, and integrations with CRM, ERP & collaboration systems, like Salesforce and HubSpot, as well as Zendesk and Microsoft Teams.

Placetel's cloud-based telephony system serves as an alternative to traditional telephone systems in offices and companies, enabling employees to make simultaneous calls from different locations and across multiple devices. The company also provides telephone numbers, including the option to add international numbers from 40 different countries.

In addition to communication technologies, Placetel provides hardware such as desk phones, cameras, headsets, and Wi-Fi access points. These are also offered as rentals, including support services and replacement options.

== History ==
Placetel was founded in 2007 and launched its cloud telephone system in 2008. In 2012, Placetel entered into a partnership with Vodafone and set up a mobile extension for its system. In 2013, BroadSoft acquired Placetel, which later became part of Cisco after its acquisition in 2018.

The company's international expansion began in 2021, with operations extending to the United Kingdom and France.

In 2024, Gamma Communications, a British cloud communications provider, acquired Placetel from Cisco. The acquisition enabled Gamma to expand its presence in European markets.
