= Gramma =

Gramma may refer to:

- An alternate spelling for the word grandma
- Gramma (fish), a genus of fishes in the family Grammatidae
- "Gramma" (short story), a short story by Stephen King, later made into a television film
- "Gramma" (The Twilight Zone), a 1986 episode of The Twilight Zone, based on Stephen King's short story
- Gramma or grama grass, plants of the genus Bouteloua
- A traditional Australian name for butternut squash
- Gramma (unit), an ancient Greek and Roman unit of mass

== See also ==
- Granma (disambiguation)
- Grama (disambiguation)
