= Grama =

Grama may refer to:

- Slang for grandmother
- Grama (government), a local governing body in India
- Grama (halacha), a concept in Jewish law
- Bouteloua, several varieties of grass

== See also ==
- Gramma (disambiguation)
- Gram (disambiguation)
- Gama (disambiguation)
- Gamma (disambiguation)
- Gam (disambiguation)
- Gramam, a 2012 Indian film
