= Mizuho Ōta =

- Mizuho Ōta
- Born: 9 December 1876; Shiojiri city, Nagano Prefecture, Japan
- Died: 1 January 1955 (aged 78); Kamakura, Kanagawa, Japan
- Occupations: Japanese poet and literary scholar
- Writing career
- Genre: waka poetry

Mizuho Ōta (太田 水穂, Ōta Mizuho; 9 December 1876 – 1 January 1955) was the pen-name of Teiichi Ōta (太田 貞一, Ōta Teiichi), a Japanese poet and scholar of Japanese literature, active in Shōwa period Japan. He also occasionally used another pen name, Mizuhonoya.

== Early life ==
Ōta was born in Chikuma District, Nagano prefecture in what is now part of the city of Shiojiri. While still a student at Nagano Normal School (now Shinshu University), he taught himself the basics of traditional Japanese poetry by studying the ancient Japanese literature classics such as the Man'yōshū and Kokinshū, When he began writing his own poetry, he was able to get it published in the prestigious literary journal, Bungakukai, which was enough to make him realize that life as a professional poet was unrealistic.

== Literary career ==
On graduation from university with a teaching certificate, he was hired by the local Matsumoto Higher Girls School. His literary interests became a hobby, and he established a waka verse coterie, called Kono-hana Kai, with friends and students. This club resulted in the waka anthologies Tsuyukusa ("Dew Flower") in 1903 and Sanjo Kojo ("On Mountain, On Lake") in 1906 brought Ōta wide recognition, although he was only a co-author.

In 1909, Ōta moved to Tokyo and was hired by the Nippon Dental University as a professor of ethics. He married former student and fellow poet Shiga Mitsuko in 1910 and the two continued their creative activities while earning their living as teachers. As fan of the works of Matsuo Bashō, in 1915, Ōta began the tanka literary magazine, Chōon to publicize his research, and gradually moved from creating his own verse to writing about the theory of tanka and his researches of the Japanese classics. Ōta's philosophy was that poetry should be primarily symbolic, and spoke out strongly against the tendency to realism exhibited by modern Japanese poets. His waka anthologies include Unchō ("Cloud Bird"), Fuyuna ("Winter Greenery"), Raden ("Mother-of-Pearly Inlay") and Ryu-o ("Bush Warbler"), which are written in a style continuing the lyric traditions of classical waka poetry.

From 1934, Ōta used a cottage in Kamakura, Kanagawa prefecture as a retreat, and moved their permanently from Tokyo in 1939 until his death. His grave is at the temple of Tōkei-ji in Kamakura.

== See also ==
- Japanese literature
- Japanese poetry
- List of Japanese authors
