= Gam (name) =

Gam is a surname, and a unisex given name. Notable people with the name include:

== Surname ==
- Bhuban Gam, Indian politician
- Dafydd Gam (1380–1415), Welsh medieval nobleman
- Giulia Gam (born 1966), Italian-born Brazilian actress
- Huỳnh Văn Gấm (1922–1987), Vietnamese painter
- Mikael Gam (1901–1982), Danish educator and independent politician
- Morgan Gam (died 1241), Welsh lord of Afan
- Rita Gam (1927–2016), American actress

== Given name ==
- Gam Malludora (1900–1969), Indian politician
- Yang Gam (born 1973), South Korean swimmer
- Htang Gam Shawng, Kachin political and military leader
