= Guide to Available Mathematical Software =

The Guide to Available Mathematical Software (GAMS) is a project of the National Institute of Standards and Technology to classify mathematical software by the type of problem that it solves. GAMS became public in 1985. It indexes Netlib and other packages, some of them public domain software and some proprietary software.
