= Gravity-assisted microdissection =

Laser microdissection method

Gravity-assisted microdissection (GAM) is one of the laser microdissection methods. The dissected material is allowed to fall by gravity into a cap and may thereafter be used for isolating proteins or genetic material. Two manufacturers in the world have developed their own device based on GAM method.

== Microdissection procedure ==
In the case of ION LMD system, after preparing sample and staining, transfer tissue on window slide. The slide is mounted inversely. Motorized stage moves to pre-selected drawing line and laser beam cuts the cells of interests by laser ablation. Selected cells are collected in the tube cap which is under the slide via gravity.

== Application ==
Dissected materials such as single cells or cell populations of interests are used for these further researches.

- Molecular pathology
- Cell biology
- Genomics
- Cancer research
- Pharmaceutical research
- Veterinary medicine
- Forensic analysis
- Reproductive medicine
