= Gamma Communications =

London-based communications company

Gamma Communications plc
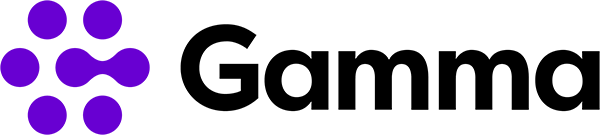
- Type: Public
- Traded as: LSE: GAMA
- Industry: Telecommunications
- Founded: 2001; 25 years ago
- Founders: Phil Corbishley and Paul Banner
- Headquarters: Newbury, Berkshire, England, UK
- Key people: Martin Hellawell (chairman); Andrew Belshaw (CEO)
- Revenue: ▲£645.8 million (2025)
- Operating income: ▲£90.9 million (2025)
- Net income: ▼£65.0 million (2025)
- Website: gammagroup.co

Gamma Communications plc is a UK-based telecommunications business specialising in Unified Communications as a Service (UCaaS). It is listed on the London Stock Exchange and is a constituent of the FTSE 250 Index.

== History ==
The company was established in 2001 by Phil Corbishley and Paul Banner with the intention of buying the assets of distressed telecommunications businesses following the collapse of the dot-com bubble, one such acquisition being of Atlantic Telecom. It benefitted from the introduction of broadband connections in the UK during the mid-2000s, building out its own national optical fibre network covering around 2,500km along with switching centres in London, Manchester and Glasgow, on top of which it operated as a carrier-grade wholesale provider.

In 2011, Gamma was to floated on the London Stock Exchange, however, this ambition was postponed on account of market conditions. Three years later, the company was floated on the Alternative Investment Market, which valued the firm at £165 million. During the mid-2010s, Gamma benefitted from consumer demand for internet-enabled voice, data and cloud services, choosing to increase its partner network as well as to focus on commercial and public sector clientel.

Gamma acquired a telecommunications Dutch-based business, Dean One, in October 2018. It also bought the Spanish-based communications service provider Voz Telecom in April 2020. One year later, it also acquired the Lancashire-based communications tools specialist Mission Labs in March 2021.

In 2024, Gamma bought a German-based communications service provider Placetel, and the customer experience specialist BrightCloud Group. That same year, the company launched a rebranding exercise aimed at raising its profile and public recognition. It also stood poised to benefit from the shutting down of traditional telephone lines by providing internet-based counterparts.

The company moved from the Alternative Investment Market to the main market of the London Stock Exchange in May 2025. That same year, it formed an alliance with O2 Daisy, which increased the business' presence on the wholesale and enterprise sectors of the market.

In April 2026, Gamma Communications stated that it was holding preliminary discussions with several different interested parties regard its potential acquisition. In September 2026, it was announced that the company had accepted an offer, which valued the company at $1.5 billion, from the private equity firm Epiris.
