= Gamma (app) =

Web-based software platform

- Operating system: Web
- Type: Presentation software; document creation software
- License: Proprietary
- Website: gamma.app

Gamma is a web-based software platform that uses artificial intelligence to generate presentations, documents, webpages, and other visual content. The platform allows users to create structured layouts and draft text based on prompts or uploaded material.

== History ==
Gamma was established in 2020. In November 2025, the company announced a Series B funding round that raised $68 million at a reported valuation of approximately $2.1 billion. Investors in the round included Andreessen Horowitz, Accel, and Uncork Capital, among others.

In 2025, cybersecurity researchers reported that Gamma had been used in a phishing campaign targeting Microsoft accounts.
