= Gamma Peak =

Mountain in Washington, United States

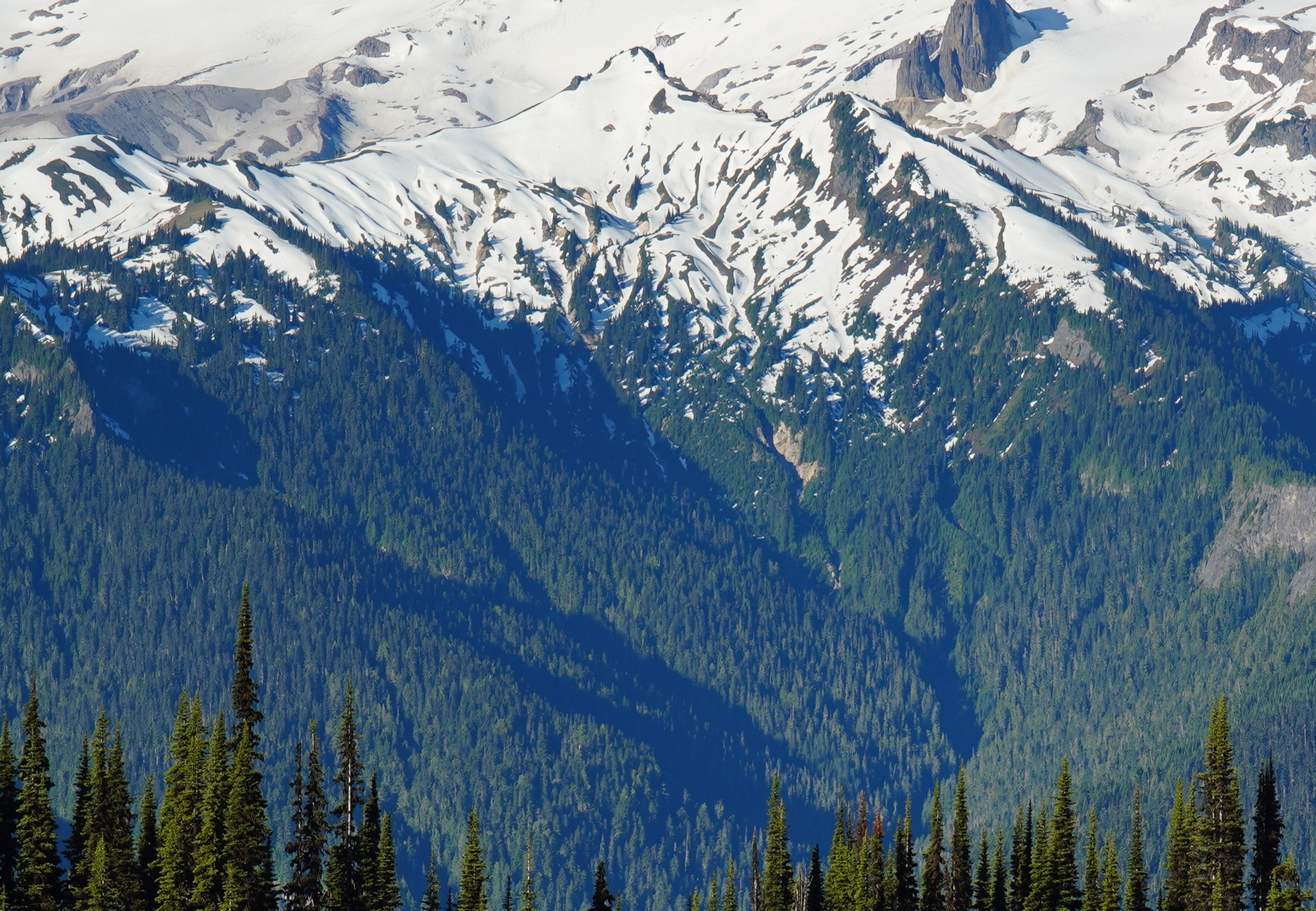
- Northeast aspect

Highest point
- Elevation: 7,005 ft (2,135 m)
- Prominence: 456 ft (139 m)
- Parent peak: Glacier Peak (10,549 ft)
- Isolation: 0.96 mi (1.54 km)
- Coordinates: 48°08′29″N 121°04′16″W

Geography
- Location within Washington (state) Location within the United States
- Interactive map of Gamma Peak
- Country: United States
- State: Washington
- County: Snohomish
- Protected area: Glacier Peak Wilderness
- Parent range: Cascade Range; North Cascades
- Topo map: USGS Gamma Peak

Geology
- Rock age: Quaternary
- Rock type: Andesite
- Volcanic arc: Cascade Volcanic Arc

Gamma Peak is a 7,005-foot (2,135-metre) summit in Snohomish County, Washington, United States.

== Description ==
Gamma Peak is located 25 miles (40 km) east-southeast of Darrington in the heart of the Glacier Peak Wilderness on land managed by Mount Baker-Snoqualmie National Forest. It is set three miles (4.8 km) northeast of Glacier Peak in the North Cascades. Precipitation runoff from the peak drains into Gamma and Dusty creeks which are tributaries of the Suiattle River. Topographic relief is significant as the summit rises 3,950 feet (1,204 meters) above the Suiattle River in three miles (4.8 km). The approach to the remote peak is via the Gamma Ridge Trail which starts in the upper Suiattle Valley near the Pacific Crest Trail. The summit provides one of the finest views in this part of the Glacier Peak Wilderness. The mountain's toponym was officially adopted in 1963 by the United States Board on Geographic Names.

== Geology ==
Subduction and tectonic activity in the area began during the late cretaceous period, about 90 million years ago. The area was previously an oceanic environment, consisting mainly of sedimentary and volcanic rocks. Extensive volcanic activity began to take place in the oligocene, about 35 million years ago. However, mountain building in the area did not begin until the Miocene, approximately 10 million years ago. Glacier Peak, a stratovolcano that is southwest of Gamma Peak, began forming in the mid-Pleistocene. Gamma Peak is composed of Quaternary andesite of the volcanic lava flows from Glacier Peak.

Throughout the ice age, the North Cascades were mostly covered in thick glaciers, extending to near Puget Sound. Glaciation was most prevalent approximately 18,000 years ago, and most valleys were ice-free by 12,000 years ago. As a result, valleys in the area are deep and U-shaped, and mountains tend to be rocky, with steep slopes and narrow summits.

== Climate ==
Gamma Peak is located in the marine west coast climate zone of western North America. Most weather fronts originating in the Pacific Ocean travel northeast toward the Cascade Mountains. As fronts approach the North Cascades, they are forced upward by the peaks of the Cascade Range (orographic lift), causing them to drop their moisture in the form of rain or snowfall onto the Cascades. As a result, the west side of the North Cascades experiences high precipitation, especially during the winter months in the form of snowfall. Because of maritime influence, snow tends to be wet and heavy, resulting in high avalanche danger. During winter months weather is usually cloudy, but due to high pressure systems over the Pacific Ocean that intensify during summer months, there is often little or no cloud cover during the summer. Due to its temperate climate and proximity to the Pacific Ocean, areas west of the Cascade Crest very rarely experience temperatures below 0 °F (−18 °C) or above 80 °F (27 °C).

== See also ==
- Geography of the North Cascades
- Geology of the Pacific Northwest
