= Gama Rural LLG =

Local-level government in Papua New Guinea

- Location within Papua New Guinea
- Coordinates: 5.2928°S 144.728299°E
- Country: Papua New Guinea
- Province: Madang Province
- District: Usino Bundi District

Area
  - Total: 1,935 km^{2} (747 sq mi)

Population (2021 Estimate)
  - Total: 15,561
  - Density: 8.042/km^{2} (20.83/sq mi)
- Time zone: UTC+10 (AEST)

Gama Rural LLG is a local-level government (LLG) of Madang Province, Papua New Guinea. As of the year 2011, it had a population of 10,840.

== Wards ==
- 35. Aingdai /Forogo
- 36. Ambisiba
- 37. Kenaint
- 38. Kinibong
- 39. Gai
- 40. Bank
- 41. Useruk
- 43. Kwaringiri
- 44. Garisakan / Umerum
- 45. Gunts
- 46. Komaraga
- 47. Kombaku
- 48. Nimbla
