= Mitsuko Shiga =

Japanese poet (1885–1976)

- Born: 21 April 1885; Nagano, Nagano, Japan
- Died: 23 March 1976 (aged 90); Kamakura, Kanagawa, Japan
- Occupation: Writer
- Writing career
- Genre: haiku poetry

Mitsuko Shiga (四賀光子, Shiga Mitsuko; 21 April 1885 – 23 March 1976) was the pen-name of Mitsu Ōta, a Japanese tanka poet active in Taishō and Shōwa periods Japan.

== Early life ==
Mitsuko was born in Nagano city, Nagano prefecture. After graduating from Nagano Normal School, she worked for two years as a teacher, during which time she met the poet Mizuho Ōta, and began to compose tanka verses herself. She entered the Tokyo Women's Higher Normal School (present-day Ochanomizu University) in 1906 and married Mizuho Ōta when she graduated.

== Literary career ==
While teaching at a girls school in Tokyo, she assisted her husband in his literary magazine, Chōon, by contributing tanka verses and helping in its overall administration. On Ota's death in 1955, she took over responsibility for the magazine with her son, Ota Seikyu.

She published numerous anthologies of her poetry during her lifetime, including Fuji no Mi ("Wisteria Beans"), Asa Tsuki ("Morning Moon"), Asa Ginu ("Linen Silk"), and Kamakura Zakki ("Kamakura Miscellany"). She also published some instructional guides to the writing of poetry, including Waka dokuhon ("A Guide to Waka Verse"), Dentō to Gendai Waka ("Tradition and Modern Waka").

Mitsuko and her husband Mizuho Ota began to live in Kamakura, Kanagawa Prefecture from 1934, calling their retreat "Yo-yo Sanso." What began as a quiet getaway became their permanent home from 1939. Shiga continued to live there after her husband's death, and died in 1976. Her grave is at the temple of Tōkei-ji in Kamakura, which also has a large stone monument inscribed with one of her verses.

== See also ==
- Japanese literature
- List of Japanese authors
