= Shinshu University =

Japanese national university in Matsumoto, Nagano Prefecture, Japan

Coordinates: 36°15′04″N 137°58′44″E

- 信州大学
- Motto: Rooted in the community, opening up the world
- Type: Public (National)
- Established: Founded 1873, Chartered 1949
- President: Kunihiro Hamada
- Faculty: 1,179
- Undergraduates: 9,202
- Postgraduates: 1,768
- Location: Matsumoto, Nagano, Japan
- Campus: Urban
- Mascot: None
- Website: www.shinshu-u.ac.jp

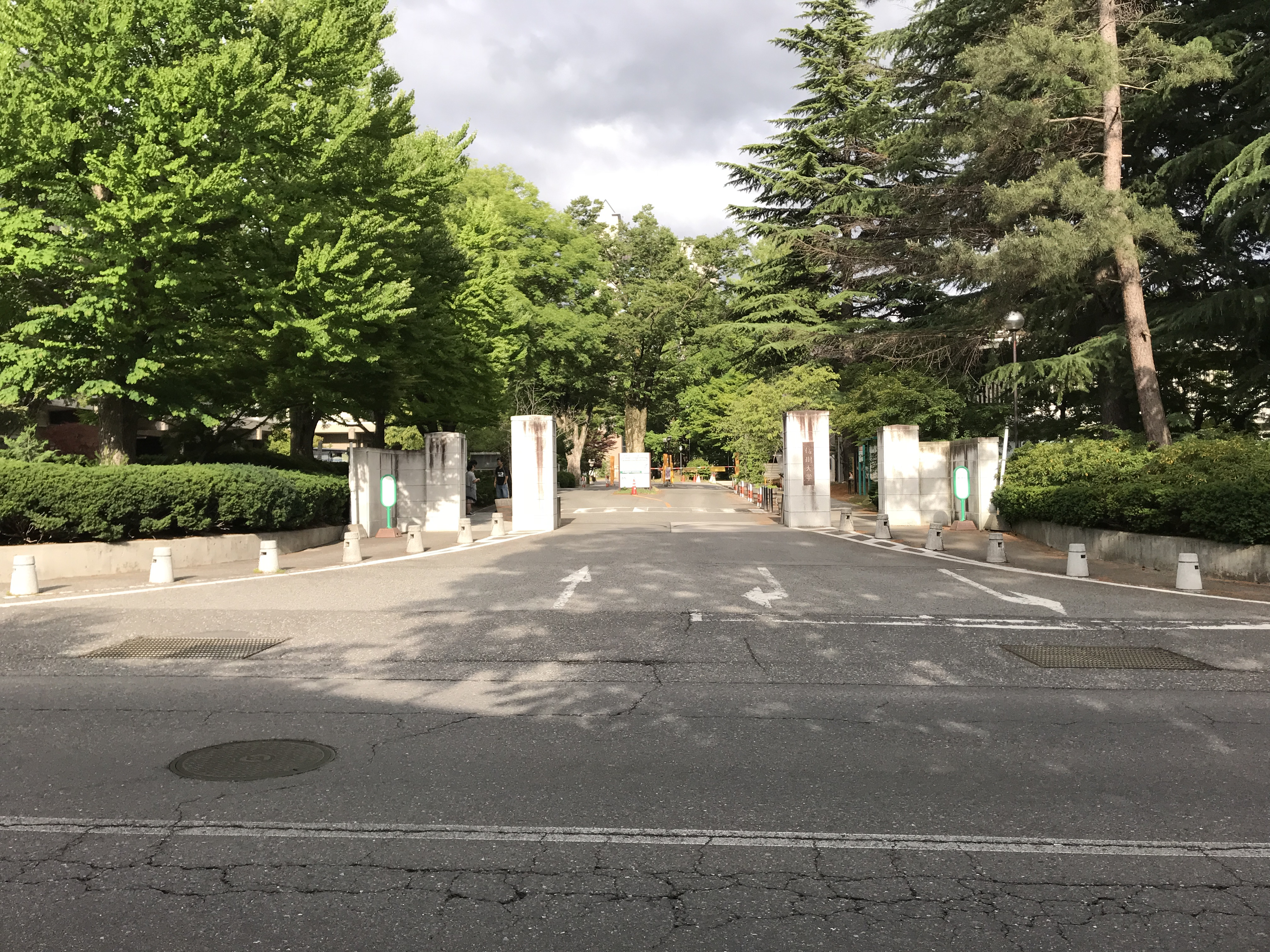
Main entrance of Shinshu University

Shinshu University (信州大学, Shinshū daigaku), abbreviated to Shindai (信大), is a Japanese national university located in Matsumoto, Nagano Prefecture, Japan. As the only national university in Japan bearing the name of a former Japanese province, it bears the name "Shinshu" (alternative name for Shinano Province). The University has four campuses; Matsumoto, Nagano, Ueda and Minami-Minowa.

The school was established as a university in 1949, at which time the following institutions were subsumed into it; Nagano Normal School (established in 1873), Ueda Textile College (1910), Nagano Youths Normal School (1918), Matsumoto High School (1919), Nagano Technical College (1943), Matsumoto Medical College (1944), and Nagano Prefectural College of Agriculture and Forestry (1945).

== History ==
Shinshu University traces its roots back to 1873 when it was a temporary normal school. The university was chartered by the Showa government in 1949 under a new Japanese education system reforming older system, merging seven institutions of higher education within Nagano Prefecture which includes Nagano Normal School (長野師範学校, Nagano shihan gakkō) established in 1873, Ueda Textile College (上田繊維専門学校, Ueda senni semmon gakkō) established in 1910, Nagano Youths Normal School (長野青年師範学校, Nagano seinen shihan gakkō) established in 1918, Matsumoto Higher School (松本高等学校, Matsumoto kōtō gakkō) established in 1919, Nagano Technical College (長野工業専門学校, Nagano kōgyō semmon gakkō) established in 1943, Matsumoto Medical College (松本医科大学, Matsumoto ika daigaku) established in 1944, and Nagano Prefectural College of Agriculture and Forestry (長野県立農林専門学校, Nagano kenritsu nōrin semmon gakkō) established in 1945. In 2004 Shinshu University became a National University Corporation under the National University Corporation Act.

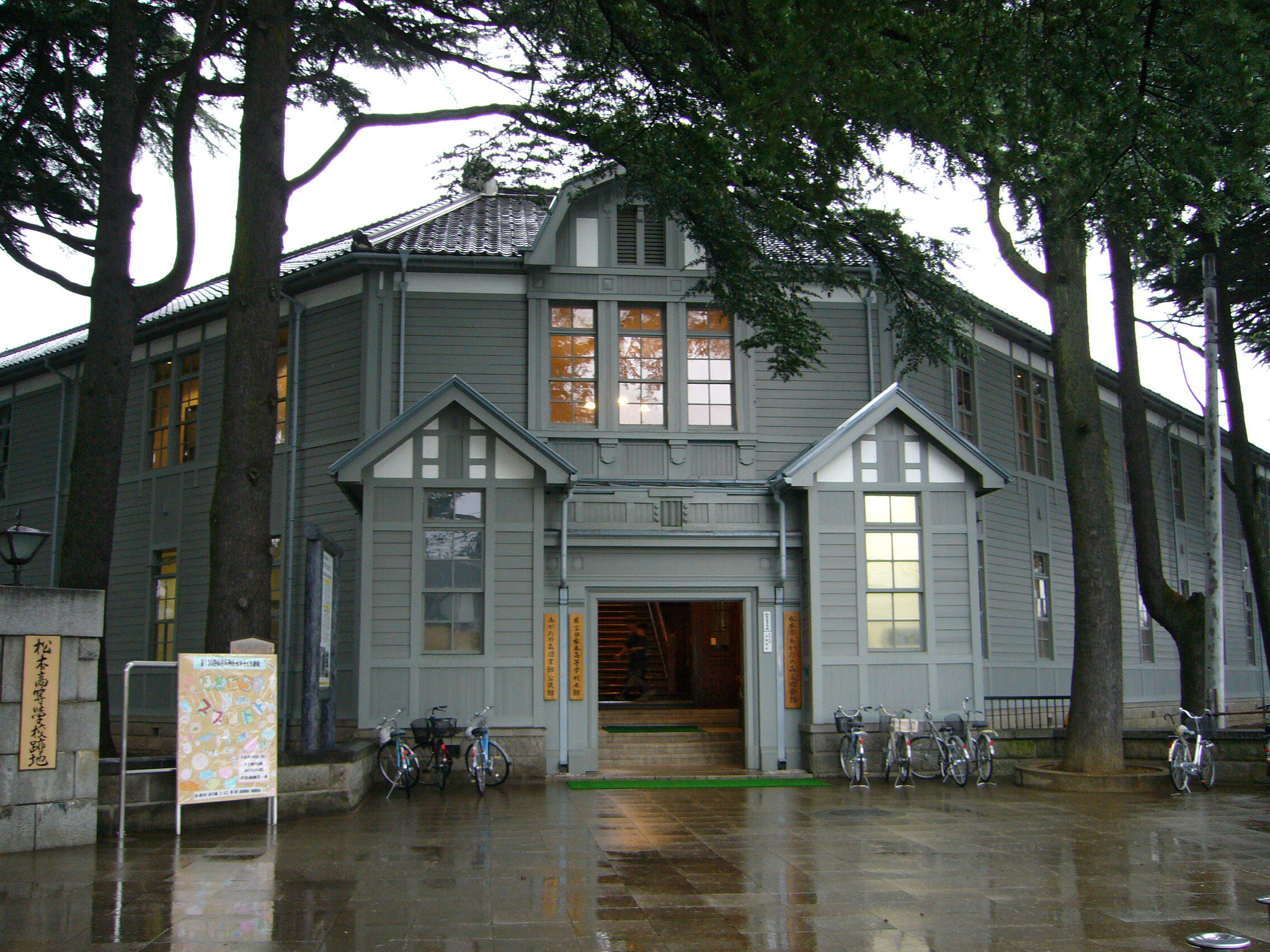
Matsumoto Higher School

== Academics ==
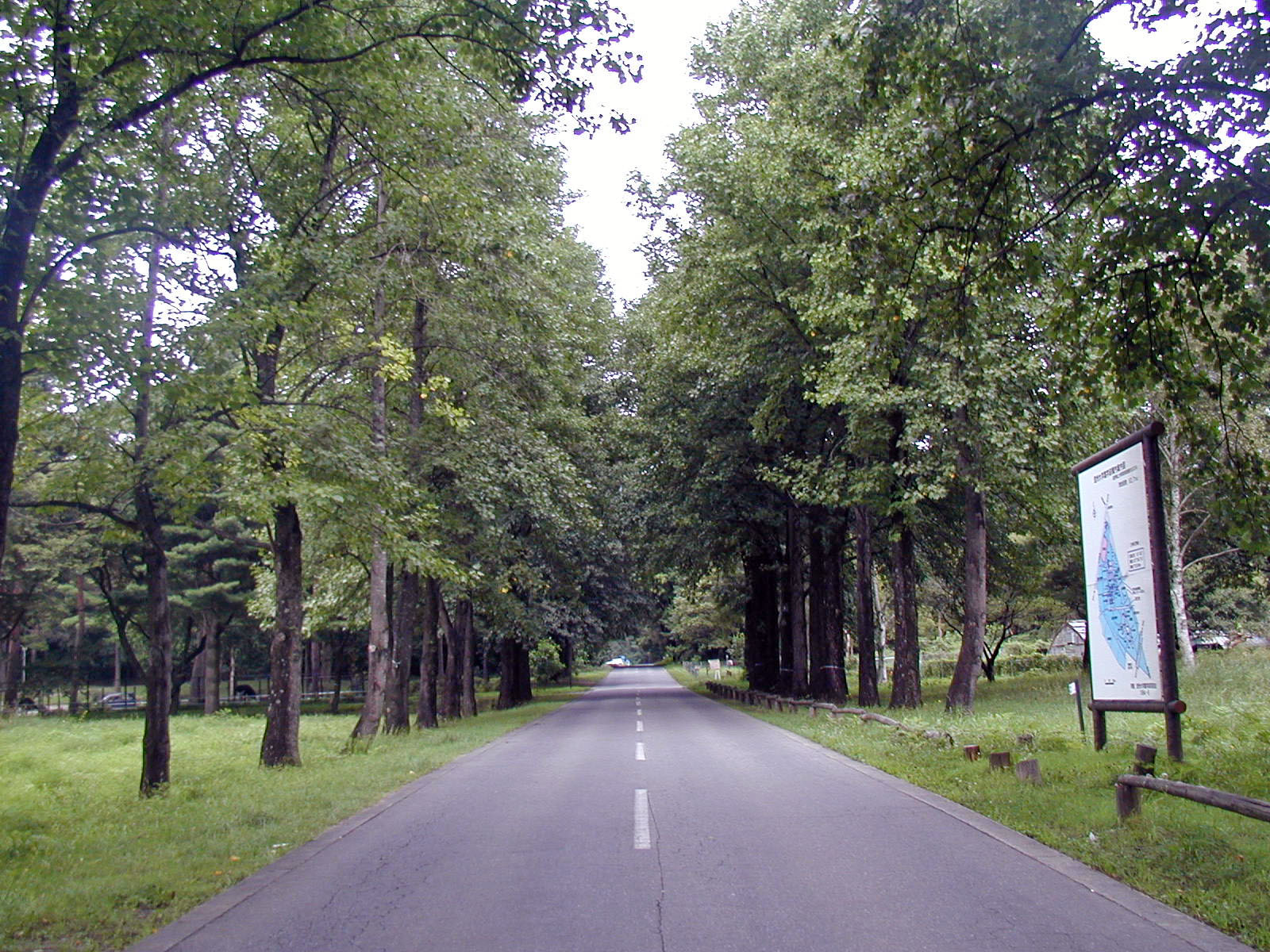
Agricultural Department

Shinshu University is a comprehensive national university having 8 faculties and 8 graduate schools. A wide range of education and research is carried out on the campuses at Matsumoto, Nagano, Ueda and Minami-Minowa with a total number of staff of 1,179 and a total number of students of about 10,970 (including about 329 foreign students). Organic collaboration between the various departments is carried out.

=== Rankings ===
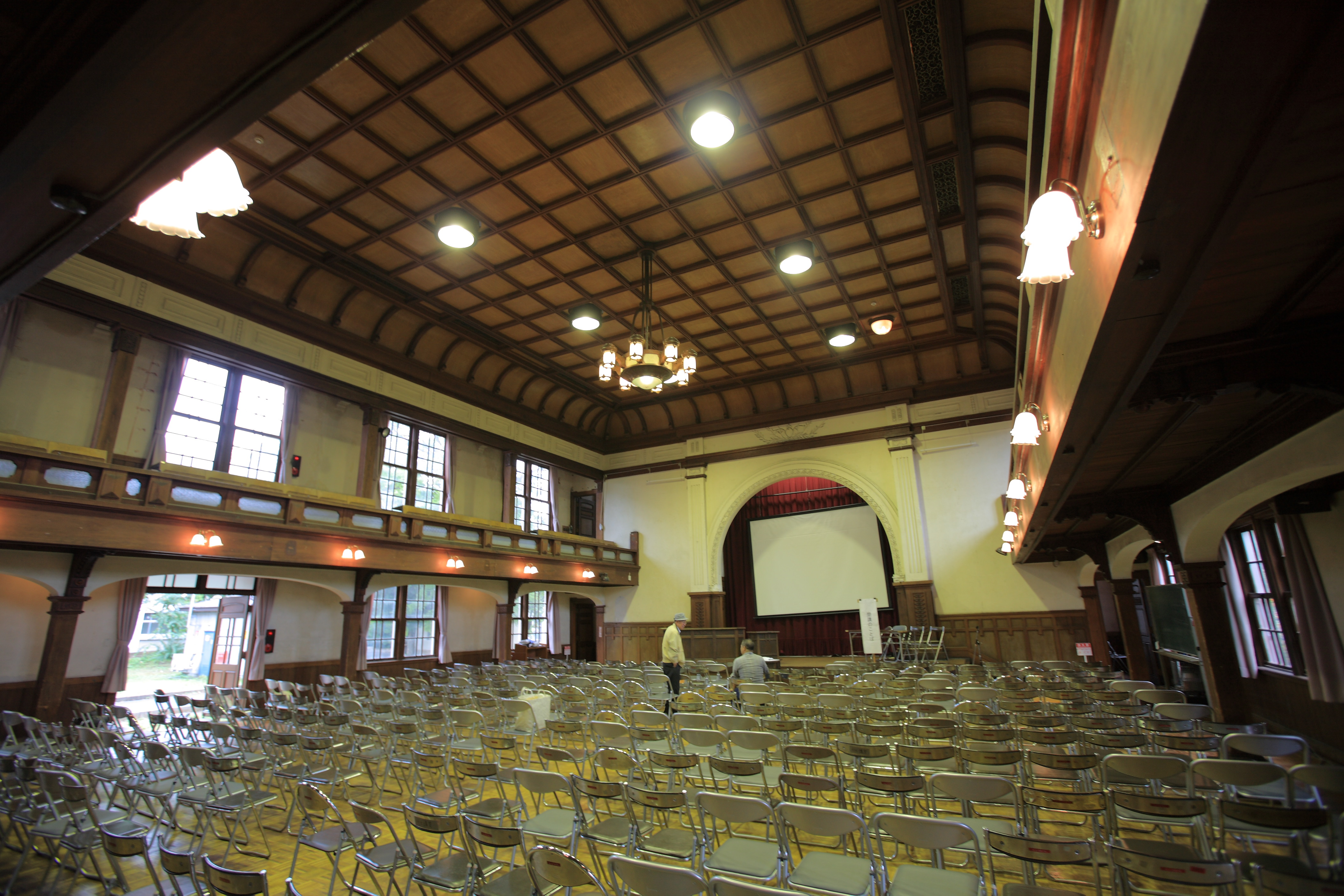
Faculty of Textile Science and Technology Auditorium. Cultural property. Construction 1929.

In September 2005, the university chair decided not to participate in national or international rankings in the foreseeable future, stating the administrative expenditures needed as a main reason. The small sample size used by many rankings and their methodology have also been criticised. However, Shinshu University is still being featured in international rankings.

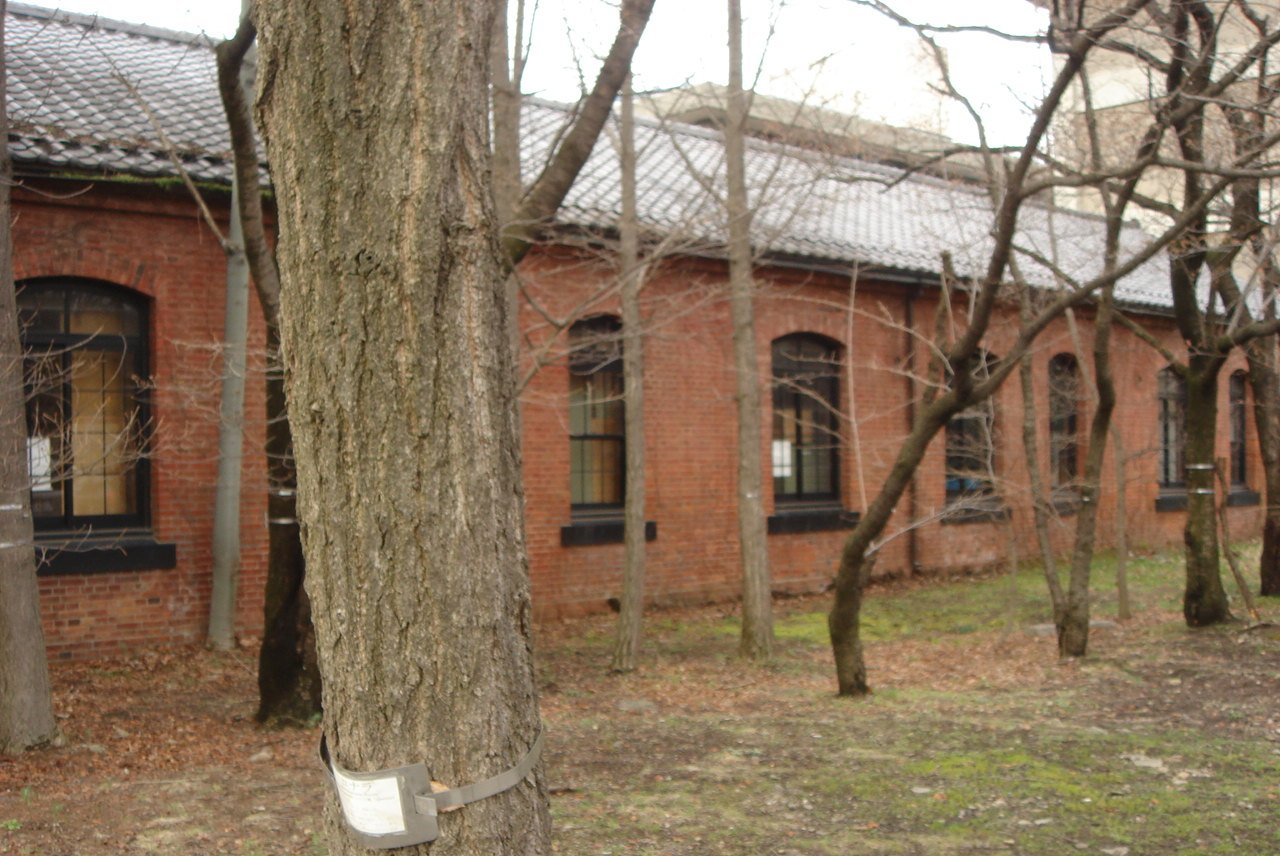
A red-brick warehouse of Medical School. Built in 1908 as a warehouse of the 50th Infantry Regiment, Imperial.

National
	2015
U.S. News & World Report Best Global University Ranking	708th
Times Higher Education World University Rankings	801–1000th
QS World University Rankings	801–1000th

QS World University Rankings
Year	Citations per Faculty (national)
2015	33rd

=== Administrative structure ===
The School of General Education The mission of the School of General Education, is to cooperate closely with the five faculties concerned with teaching (Faculty of Arts, Faculty of Science, Faculty of Engineering, Faculty of Agriculture, and Faculty of Textile Science and Technology) to make individuals acquire high professional skills based on the basic university policies for education. Furthermore, it aims to promote the educational research development and manage its plan comprehensively based on the university wide common perspective.

The Faculty of Textile Science and Technology

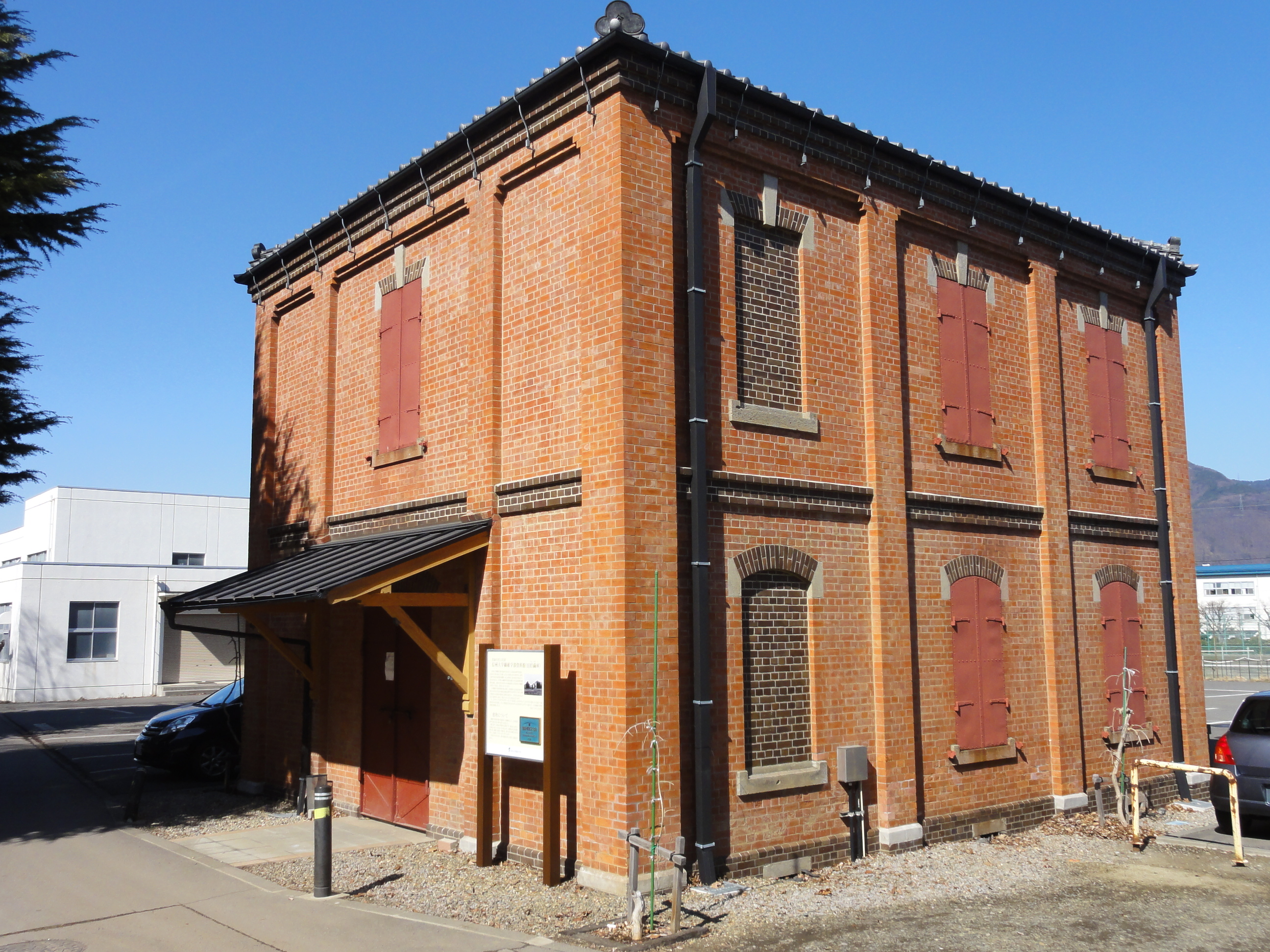
Faculty of Textile Science and Technology

The Faculty of Textile Science and Technology is the only faculty in Japan with "Textile" in its name. It is recognized as an international research center in fiber engineering, and in 2010 celebrated the centenary of its establishment. It is ranked 35th in the sub-category "Textiles" in the international Science Citations Index. It is also ranked 50th in the "composites" sub-category. In 2012 they joined the Association of Universities for Textiles (AUTEX) based in Europe, to vitalize international exchange and collaboration.

Faculties

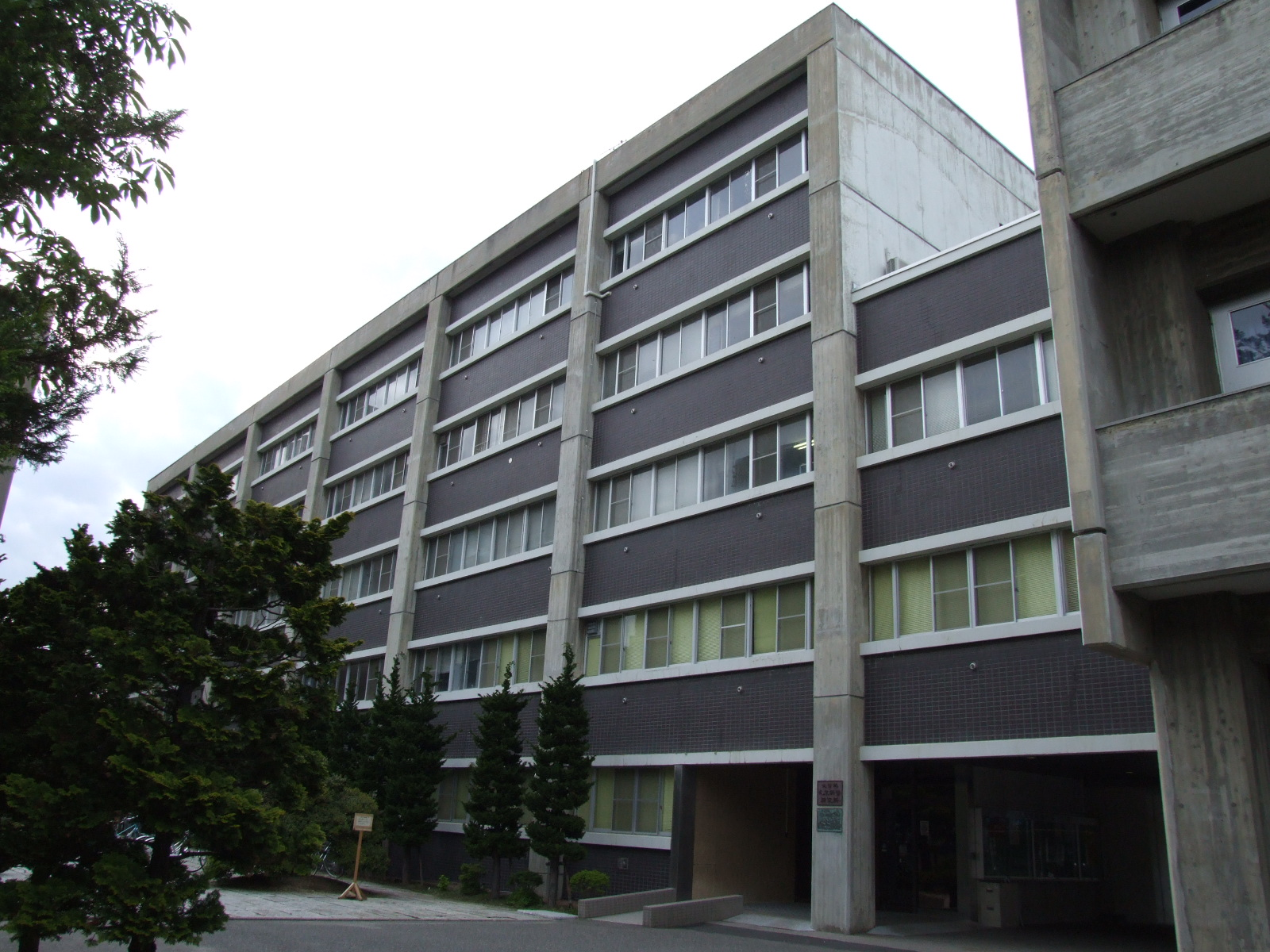
Faculty of Arts

- Arts
- School of Medicine
- Engineering
- Science
- Agriculture
- Economics
- Education
- Textile Science and Technology

Graduate Schools

The Shinshu University Graduate School is unique in that it offers interdisciplinary research courses that capitalize on the overall strengths of the university. Such courses allow students to explore issues such as fundamental philosophy, practical engineering, medicine, and law to contribute to the harmonious coexistence of nature and human society.

- Division of Arts
- Division of Education
- Division of Industrial and Social Studies
- Graduate School of Science and Technology
- Interdisciplinary Graduate School of Science and Technology
- Division of Agriculture
- Graduate School of Medicine
- School of Law

=== List of facilities and associated institutes ===
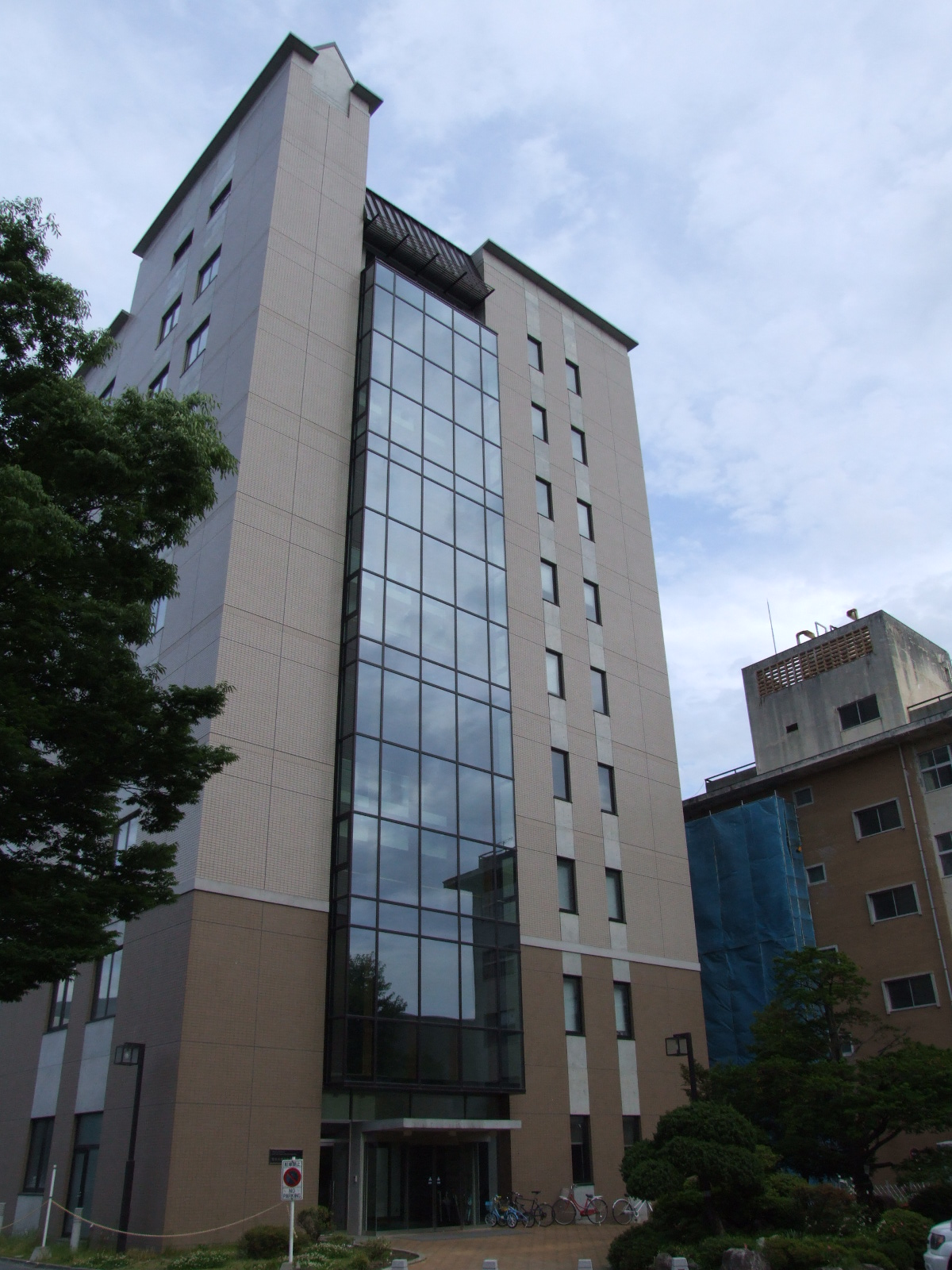
Asahi Life Science Research Building Institute for Biomedical Sciences (IBS) Research Center for Human and Environmental Science (Division of Instrumental Analysis)

Interdisciplinary Cluster for Cutting Edge Research (ICCER), a World-class International Research Center has been established bringing together research resources in 5 research areas:

- Institute of Carbon Science and Technology
- Center for Energy and Environmental Science

To propose new dimensional solutions for environmental and energy materials research

- Institute for Fiber Engineering

research continues to innovate textiles

- Institute of Mountain Science

Research into Mountain Science in Japan, Asia, and on a Global Scale

- Institute for Biomedical Sciences

To contribute to the ultra-aged society by original research in biological sciences and medical research, with the aim of sustainable development

University Library consists of the libraries found in each of the five campuses within Nagano Prefecture as follows: Central Library, Medical Library (Matsumoto Campus), Educational Library (Nagano-Education Campus), Engineering Library (Nagano-Engineering Campus), Agricultural Library (Ina Campus), Textile Science and Technology Library (Ueda Campus). Each library has its unique specialty and having mutual linkage. User can ask materials in a library in other campus to be sent to his nearest campus for use. Also, the libraries are open to the citizens, showing that the university is open to the regional community. Referencing, copying, and inquiry services are accepted. Also, it is possible to borrow the materials on the open shelves that are for check-out.

University Hospital, equipped with 707 beds and 65 clinics, operates as a general treatment center, a teaching hospital, and specialized clinical research facility. Some of the hospital's most recent successes include the world's first adult living donor liver transplant and the country's first brain-dead donor liver transplant.

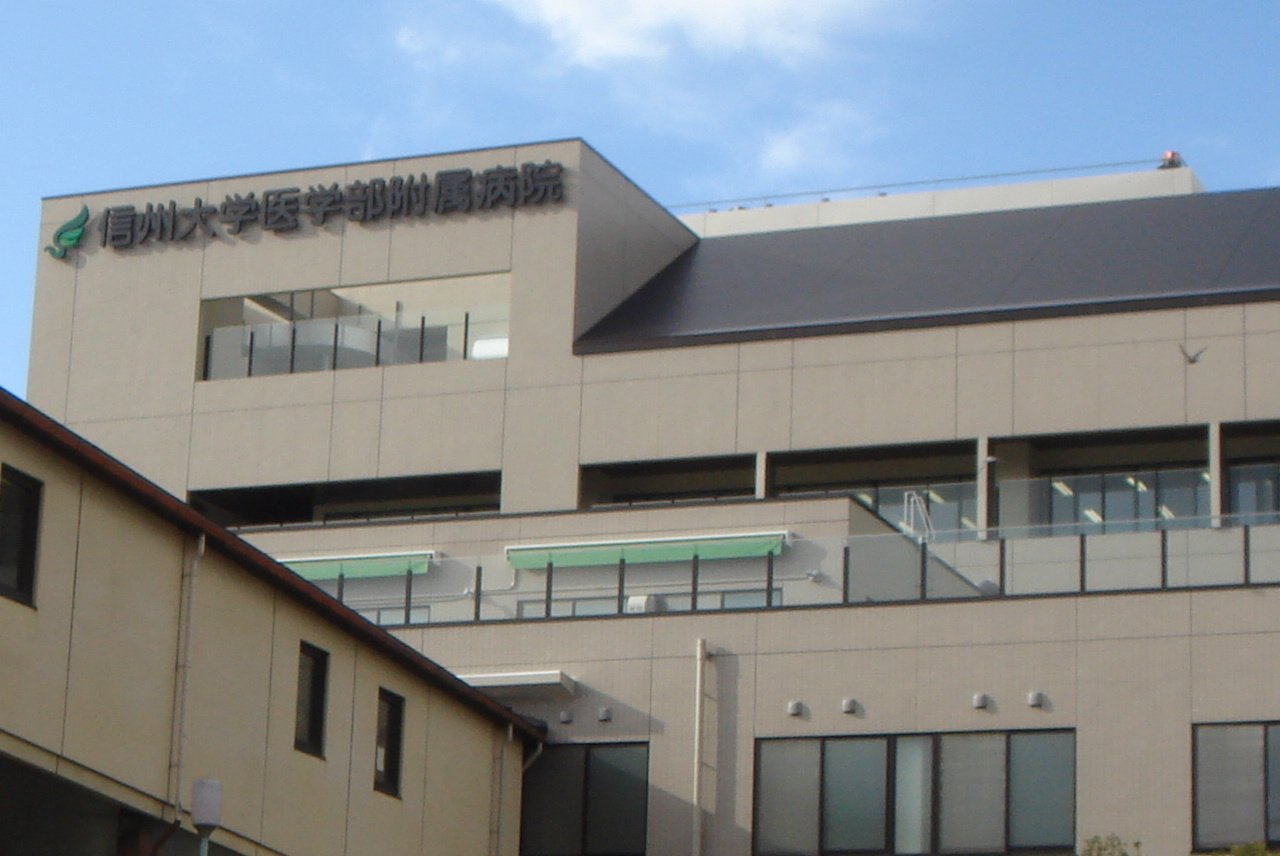
Shinshu University Hospital

Research Center for Human and Environmental Sciences aims to not only facilitate the cooperation among the fields of gene research, animal experiments, instrumental analysis, and radioisotope application to support the research which need higher techniques with safety and efficiency but also cultivate individuals with the skills necessary to conduct research in all these fields.

Cooperative Research Center aims to not only contribute to technological development and technical training in local society but also stimulate research and education within Shinshu University through cooperative research between members of various university departments and those in the industry.

Satellite Venture Business Laboratory (SVBL) aims to promote creative research and development that can form the basis of a venture business and foster talented individuals who have advanced technical occupational abilities.

Center for Shinshu Medical Innovation of Regional Technology (CSMIT) aims to leverage and develop research seeds and technical seeds of Shinshu University etc. for the medical fields to enhance the regional medical industry dramatically. The industry, academic, and governmental organizations collaborate tightly to work on research development, commercialization, and talent cultivation.

Fiber Innovation Incubator (Fii) has a pilot line capable of research and development ranging from production of practical prototype products and analysis and evaluation, using the most advanced fiber engineering equipment. It also functions as a link with overseas universities and a hub for international information.

Shinshu Incubation Center for Medical Device and Functional Food Development is located on Shinshu University Matsumoto Campus, and has more than 50 types of analytical equipment, to stimulate local innovation. Active support is provided to accelerate joint industrial-academic-government research by local companies in the medical field.

Innovation Research and Support Center aims to not only conduct innovative research within and outside the university but also enhance association with industry, academia, and the government in cooperation with the Japanese Organizations for Small & Medium Enterprises and the prefectural Tourism and Industry Organizations.

Research Center for Higher Education aims to not only support the construction of a systematic course of study at Shinshu University but also promotes the research and development of strategic methods that assure the quality of education.

Shinshu Advanced Science and Technology Center (SASTec) provides space for technical development and collaborative research, etc., between academic staff of the Faculty of Engineering and private companies, with the objective of creation of biomass and food related industries, advanced new materials, IT and embedded devices industries, etc., as a prototype development factory that will contribute to the vitalization of local industries.

== Notable people ==
=== Professor ===
- Akira Ikegami, a visiting professor and a journalist.
- Morinobu Endo, a chemist in the field of carbon nanotubes.
- Pulickel Ajayan, an nanotechnologist.
- Mildred Dresselhaus, a physicist.
- Gordon Wallace, a scientist in the field of electromaterials.
- Shuji Nakamura, a visiting professor and one of the 2014 Nobel Prize in Physics for inventing the blue LED.

=== Alumni ===
- Naoki Inose, Governor of Tokyo, a journalist.
- Gorō Miyazaki, a film director at Studio Ghibli, and the son of Hayao Miyazaki.
- Morinobu Endo, a chemist in the field of carbon nanotubes.
- Mitsu Shimojo, Parliamentary Vice-Minister of Defense.
- Akiko Kumai, a potpourri expert.
- Kei Kumai, a film director.
- Kyoko Ishida, Olympic medalists in volleyball
- Sohei Miyashita, Head of the Japan Defense Agency and the Environmental Agency.
- Koji Kobayashi, a computer scientist.
- Morio Kita, a novelist, essayist.
- Shinroku Momose, an aircraft/automotive engineer.
- Mizuho Ōta, a poet.
- Kiyoshige Koyama, a composer for orchestras.
- Takahisa Oguchi, a luger.
- Mitsuko Shiga, a poet.
- Shinichi Fukushima, a racing cyclist.

=== Alumni of attached schools ===
- Naoki Inose, Governor of Tokyo, a journalist.
- Yasuo Tanaka, Governor of Nagano Prefecture
- Takashi Yamamoto, a pianist.
- Masachi Osawa, a sociologist.
- Haruyo Ichikawa, a film actress and singer.

Full list can be found in the Japanese Wikipedia article: List of Shinshu University people (in Japanese)
