= Gramm (surname) =

Gramm is a surname. Notable people with the surname include:

- Donald Gramm (1927–1983), American bass-baritone
- Lou Gramm (born 1950), musician with the band Foreigner
- Phil Gramm (born 1942), American politician
- Wendy Lee Gramm (born 1945), think tank chairman

Fictional characters:

- Jack Gramm, character in 2008 film 88 minutes
