= Da Gama Park =

Suburb of the City of Cape Toen, Western Cape, South Africa

- Location within Western Cape Location within South Africa
- Coordinates: 34.161°S 18.403°E
- Country: South Africa
- Province: Western Cape
- Municipality: City of Cape Town
- Main Place: Simon's Town

Area
  - Total: 1.17 km^{2} (0.45 sq mi)

Population (2011)
  - Total: 1,463
  - Density: 1,250/km^{2} (3,240/sq mi)

Racial makeup (2011)
  - Black African: 39.7%
  - Coloured: 25.1%
  - Indian/Asian: 14.5%
  - White: 19.5%
  - Other: 1.2%

First languages (2011)
  - English: 46.4%
  - Afrikaans: 20.3%
  - Xhosa: 9.6%
  - Zulu: 8.0%
  - Other: 15.6%
- Time zone: UTC+2 (SAST)
- Postal code (street): 7975

Da Gama Park is a suburb of the City of Cape Town in the Western Cape province of South Africa.

Da Gama Park was founded as a township in the former Simon's Town district, north-west of the town. Situated in the Else River Valley, it was established for men of the Navy and their families. It was named after Vasco da Gama (1460 or 1469–1524), the Portuguese navigator.
