= Granma =

Granma may refer to:

== Cuba ==
=== Places ===
- Granma Province, a Cuban province
- University of Granma, a university in Bayamo, Granma Province, Cuba

=== Sports ===
- CF Granma, a Cuban football club
- Granma (baseball) or Granma Alazanes, a baseball team in the Cuban National Series

=== Other uses ===
- Granma (yacht), a yacht in which Fidel Castro and his revolutionary expedition sailed to Cuba in 1956
- Granma (newspaper), the official newspaper of the Cuban Communist Party

== Other uses ==
- A female grandparent; see Grandma (disambiguation)
- Granma, comic book character in Agnes

== See also ==
- Grandma (disambiguation)
