= Gam, Cornwall =

Coordinates: 50.568°N 4.703°W

Gam
- Location within Cornwall
- OS grid reference: SX087777
- Civil parish: St Breward
- Unitary authority: Cornwall
- Ceremonial county: Cornwall
- Region: South West
- Country: England
- Sovereign state: United Kingdom
- Post town: Bodmin
- Postcode district: PL30

Gam is a hamlet in the parish of St Breward (where the 2011 census population is included), Cornwall, England.
