= Vasco da Gama station =

Vasco da Gama station may refer to:

- Vasco da Gama railway station, a railway station in Goa, India
- Vasco da Gama station (Porto Metro), a station on the Porto Metro in Portugal
