= Gam (nautical term) =

Social visit by a whaling ship

Gam is a nautical term to describe one whaling ship (or "whaler") paying a social visit to another at sea. The term was first used to describe a school of whales, and whalemen may have taken its meaning from that source.

== Examples ==
Herman Melville titles Chapter 53 of Moby-Dick, "The Gam." After explaining that the word does not appear in dictionaries, he gives his own definition:

GAM. Noun - A social meeting of two (or more) Whale-ships, generally on a cruising- ground; when, after exchanging hails, they exchange visits by boats' crews: the two captains remaining, for the time, on board of one ship, and the two chief mates on the other.

He then expounds its meaning for whalers:

What does the whaler do when she meets another whaler in any sort of decent weather? She has a "Gam", a thing so utterly unknown to all other ships that they never heard of the name even; and if by chance they should hear of it, they only grin at it, and repeat gamesome stuff about "spouters" and "blubber- boilers," and such like pretty exclamations.

William Hussey Macy describes the meeting of two ships at sea as a "beautiful and imposing sight". He describes a "good old-fashioned 'gam'" as "rough entertainment," but with a "vein of politeness and deference to their guests... which might be studied with profit by many accostomed to more courtly circles." Macy reported that "a man who should overstep certain bonds in his intercourse with visitors from a strange ship... would be taken to task unmercifully by his shipmates." A gam would also be the occasion for the exchange of newspapers, perhaps letters, and tobacco.

== See also ==
- Glossary of nautical terms (disambiguation)
