= Gene-activated matrix =

In gene-activated matrix technology (GAM), cytokines and growth factors could be delivered not as recombinant proteins but as plasmid genes. GAM is one of the tissue engineering approaches to wound healing. Following gene delivery, the recombinant cytokine could be expressed in situ by endogenous would healing cells – in small amounts but for a prolonged period of time – leading to reproducible tissue regeneration. The matrix can be modified by incorporating a viral vector, mRNA or DNA bound to a delivery system, or a naked plasmid.
