= 1957 in Japan =

- Decades: 1930s; 1940s; 1950s; 1960s; 1970s
- See also: Other events of 1957; History of Japan • Timeline • Years

Events in the year 1957 in Japan. It corresponds to Shōwa 32 (昭和32年) in the Japanese calendar.

== Incumbents ==
- Emperor: Hirohito
- Prime Minister: Tanzan Ishibashi (until 31 January), then Kishi Nobusuke

=== Governors ===
- Aichi Prefecture: Mikine Kuwahara
- Akita Prefecture: Yūjirō Obata
- Aomori Prefecture: Iwao Yamazaki
- Chiba Prefecture: Hitoshi Shibata
- Ehime Prefecture: Sadatake Hisamatsu
- Fukui Prefecture: Seiichi Hane
- Fukuoka Prefecture: Taichi Uzaki
- Fukushima Prefecture: Sakuma Ootake (until 25 July); Zenichiro Satō (starting 25 August)
- Gifu Prefecture: Kamon Muto
- Gunma Prefecture: Toshizo Takekoshi
- Hiroshima Prefecture: Hiroo Ōhara
- Hokkaido: Toshifumi Tanaka
- Hyogo Prefecture: Masaru Sakamoto
- Ibaraki Prefecture: Yoji Tomosue
- Ishikawa Prefecture: Jūjitsu Taya
- Iwate Prefecture: Senichi Abe
- Kagawa Prefecture: Masanori Kaneko
- Kagoshima Prefecture: Katsushi Terazono
- Kanagawa Prefecture: Iwataro Uchiyama
- Kochi Prefecture: Masumi Mizobuchi
- Kumamoto Prefecture: Saburō Sakurai
- Kyoto Prefecture: Torazō Ninagawa
- Mie Prefecture: Satoru Tanaka
- Miyagi Prefecture: Yasushi Onuma
- Miyazaki Prefecture: Jingo Futami
- Nagano Prefecture: Torao Hayashi
- Nagasaki Prefecture: Takejirō Nishioka
- Nara Prefecture: Ryozo Okuda
- Niigata Prefecture: Kazuo Kitamura
- Oita Prefecture: Kaoru Kinoshita
- Okayama Prefecture: Yukiharu Miki
- Osaka Prefecture: Bunzō Akama
- Saga Prefecture: Naotsugu Nabeshima
- Saitama Prefecture: Hiroshi Kurihara
- Shiga Prefecture: Kotaro Mori
- Shiname Prefecture: Yasuo Tsunematsu
- Shizuoka Prefecture: Toshio Saitō
- Tochigi Prefecture: Kiichi Ogawa
- Tokushima Prefecture: Kikutaro Hara
- Tokyo: Seiichirō Yasui
- Tottori Prefecture: Shigeru Endo
- Toyama Prefecture: Minoru Yoshida
- Wakayama Prefecture: Shinji Ono
- Yamagata Prefecture: Tōkichi Abiko
- Yamaguchi Prefecture: Taro Ozawa
- Yamanashi Prefecture: Hisashi Amano

== Events ==
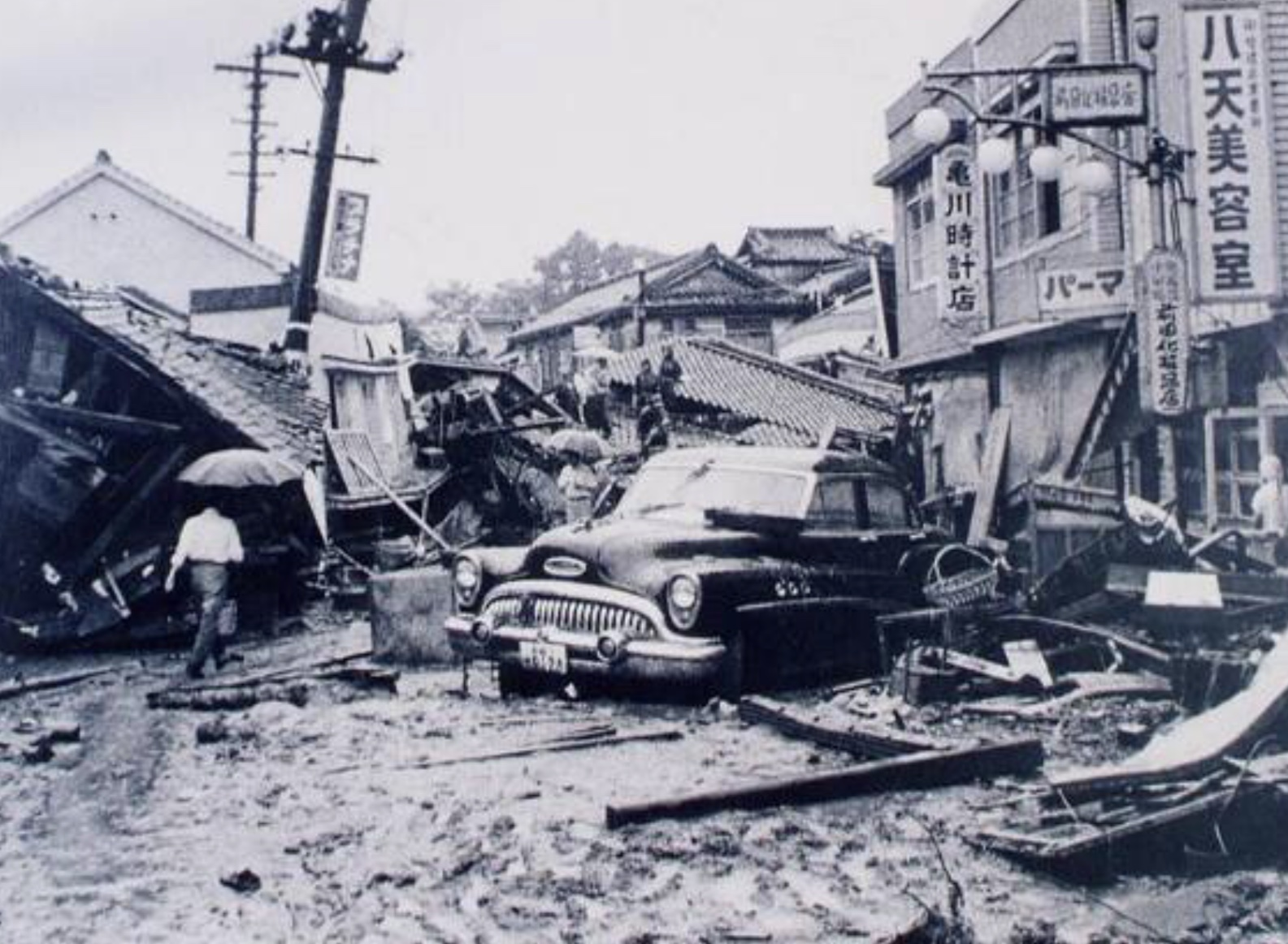
An overview on 1957 Isahaya floods

- April 1 – Yoyogi Seminar Cram School was founded.
- April 12 – According to Japan Coast Guard official confirmed report, a sightseeing boat Kitagawa Maru No 5 capsize by overcrowded off Onomichi, Hiroshima Prefecture, 113 persons perished, with 49 persons wounded.
- May 8 – Coca-Cola, full-scale sale start in Japan.
- June 20 – Toru Takemitsu's Requiem for Strings is first performed, by the Tokyo Symphony Orchestra.
- July 25–28 – According to Japanese government official confirmed report, heavy massive torrential rain and flood swept hit around Isahaya, Kyushu Island. 992 persons lost their lives in mudslides and flooding.
- October 27 – According to Fire and Disaster Management Agency has official report, An apartment house caught fire by arsonist relative insurance fraud in Akishima, Tokyo, kills eight persons, injures six persons, Japan National Police Agency official report, a suspicion was arrested on March 8, 1958.
- November 15 – A first section Nagoya to Sakae of Nagoya Municipal Subway Higashiyama Line operation started in Aichi Prefecture.

== Births ==
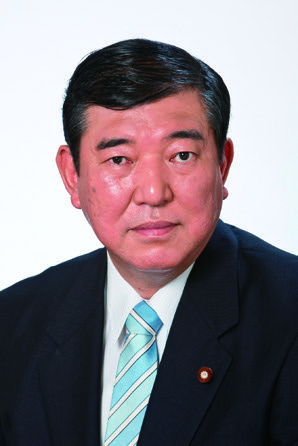
Shigeru Ishiba, former Prime Minister of Japan (2024–2025)

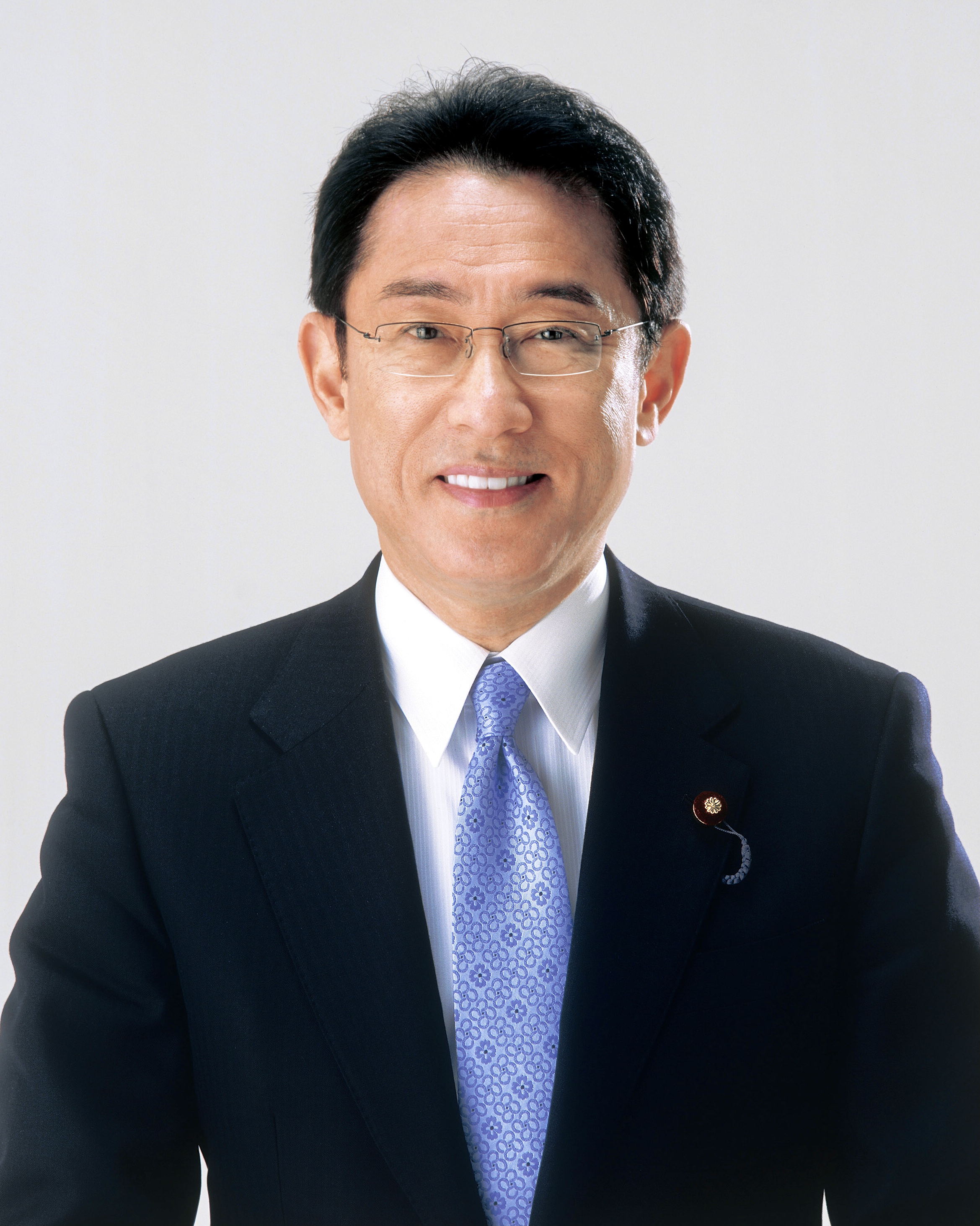
Fumio Kishida, former Prime Minister of Japan (2021–2024)

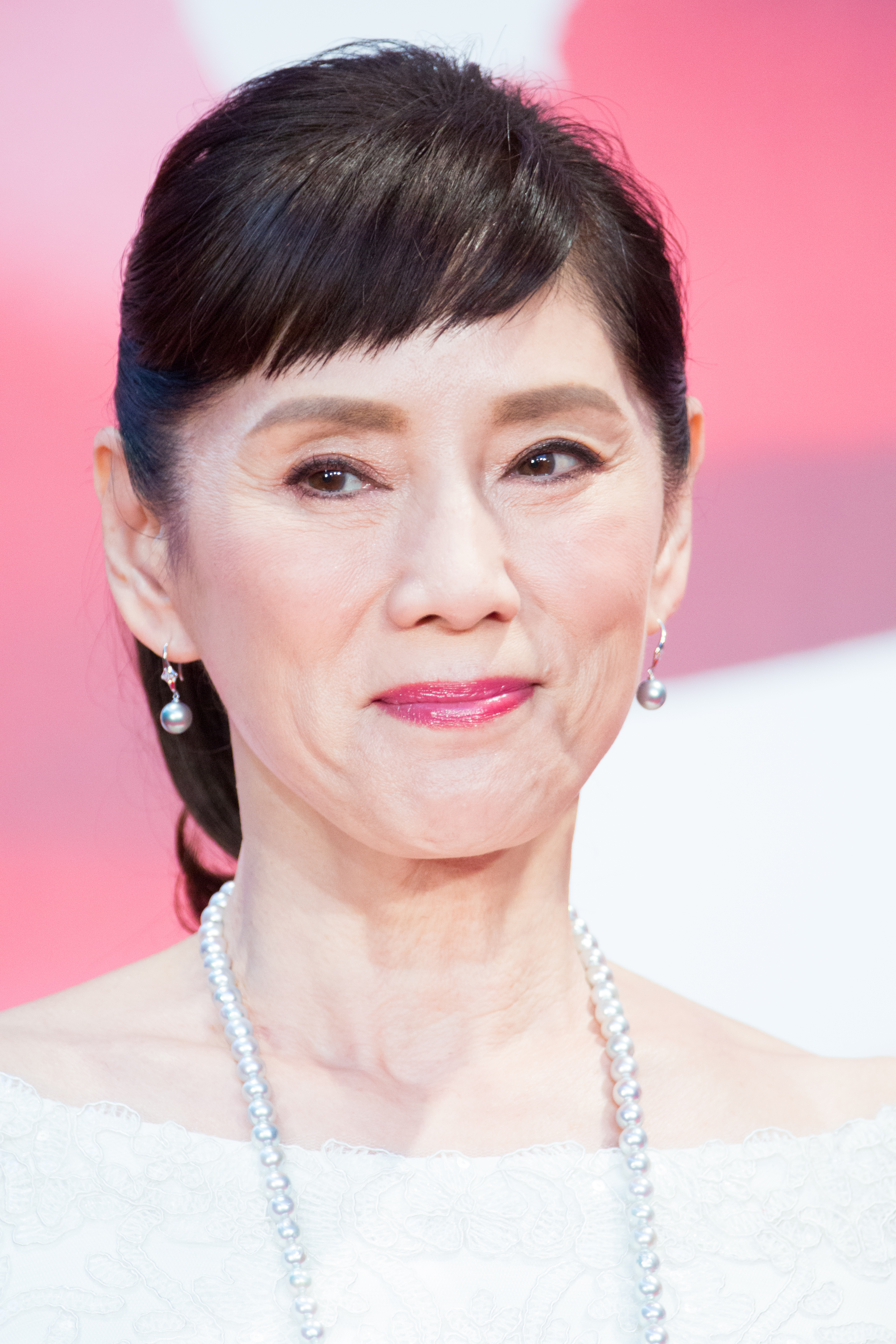
Yoko Akino, Japanese actress

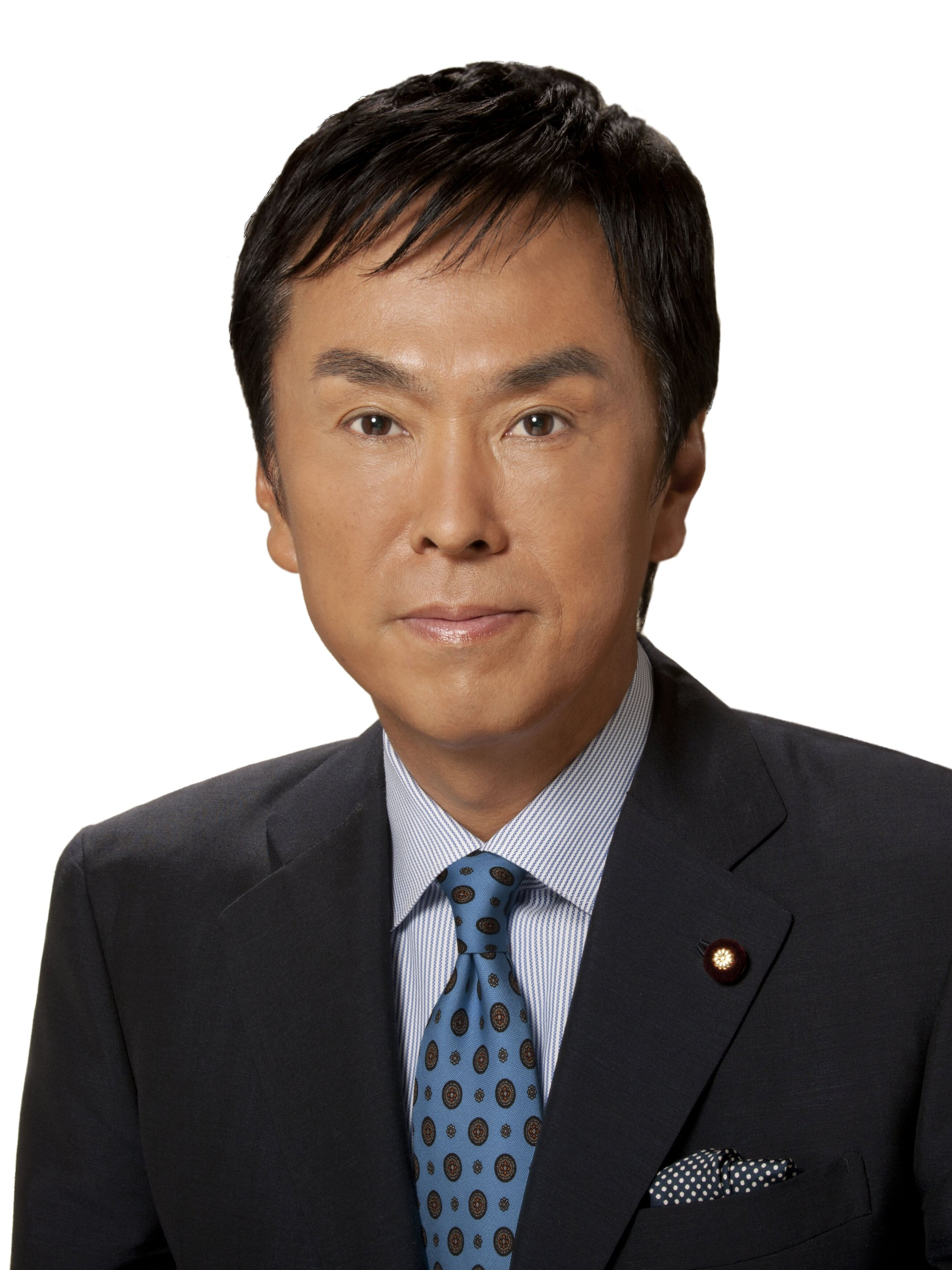
Nobuteru Ishihara, Japanese politician and the son of Noriko and Shintaro Ishihara

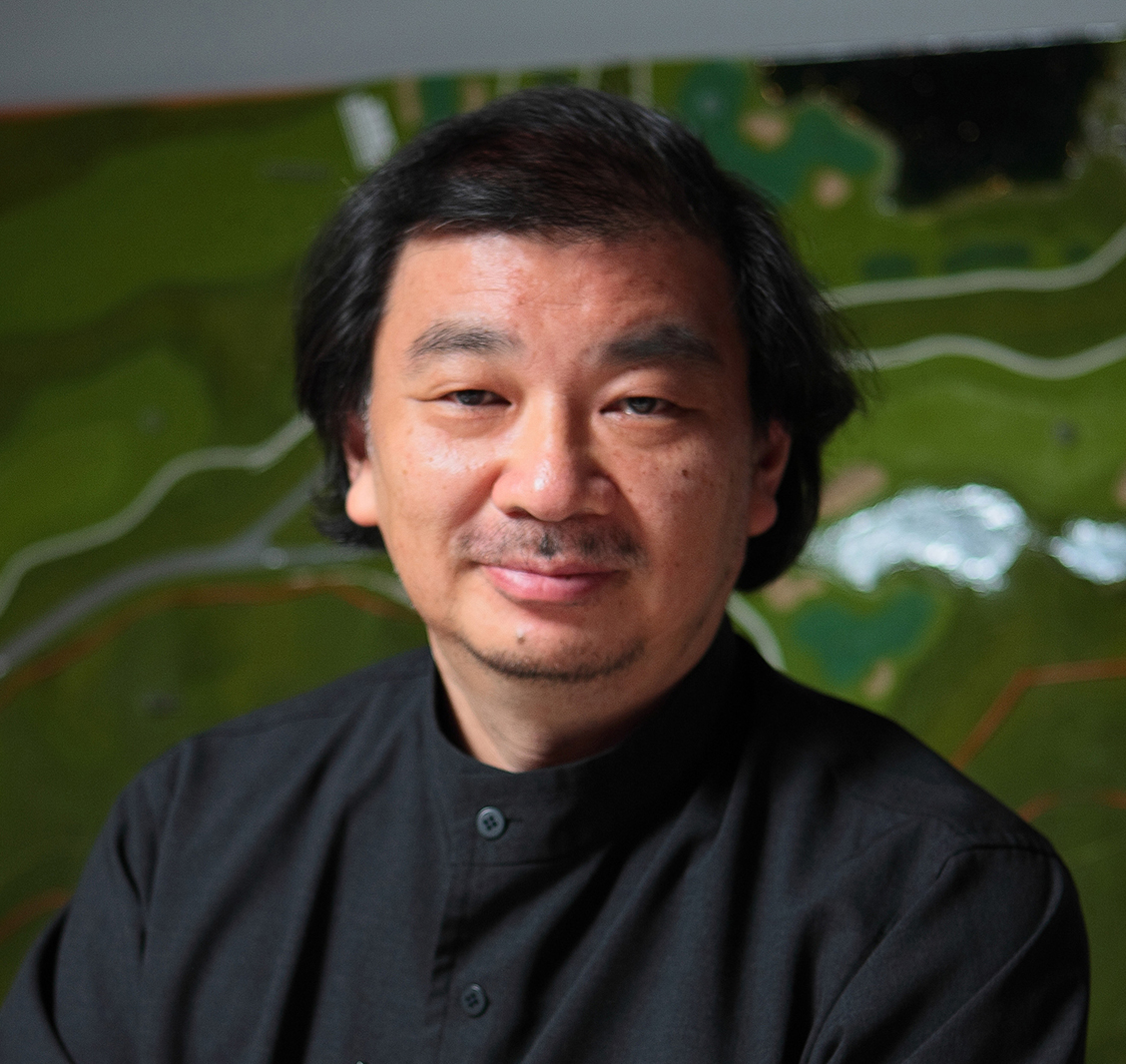
Shigeru Ban, Japanese architect

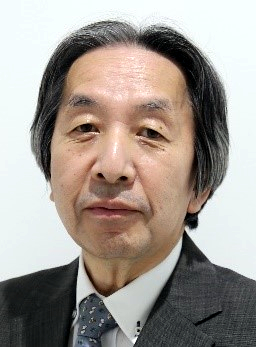
Masahiro Hara, Japanese engineer

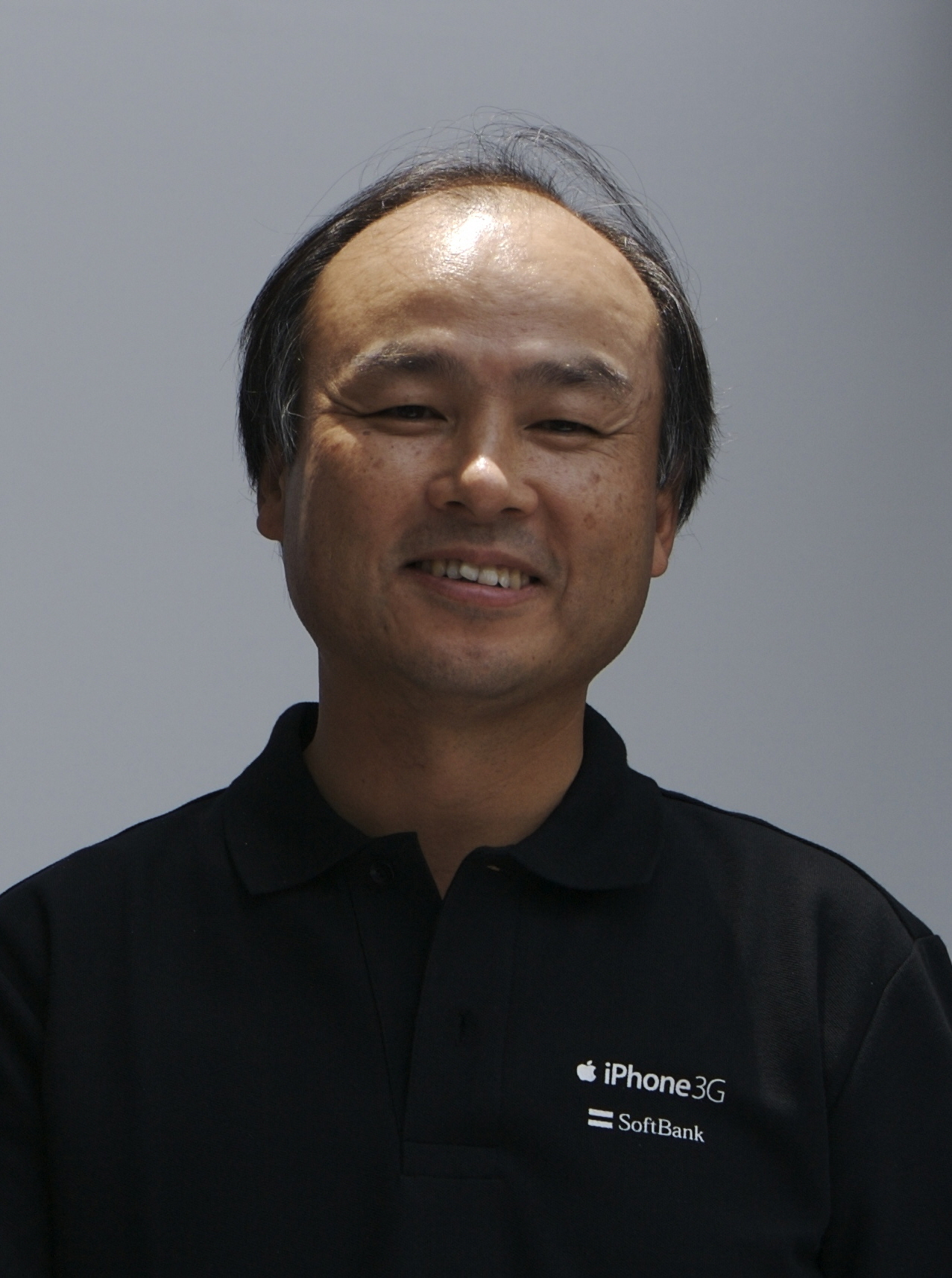
Masayoshi Son, Korean-born Japanese entrepreneur, investor, and philanthropist

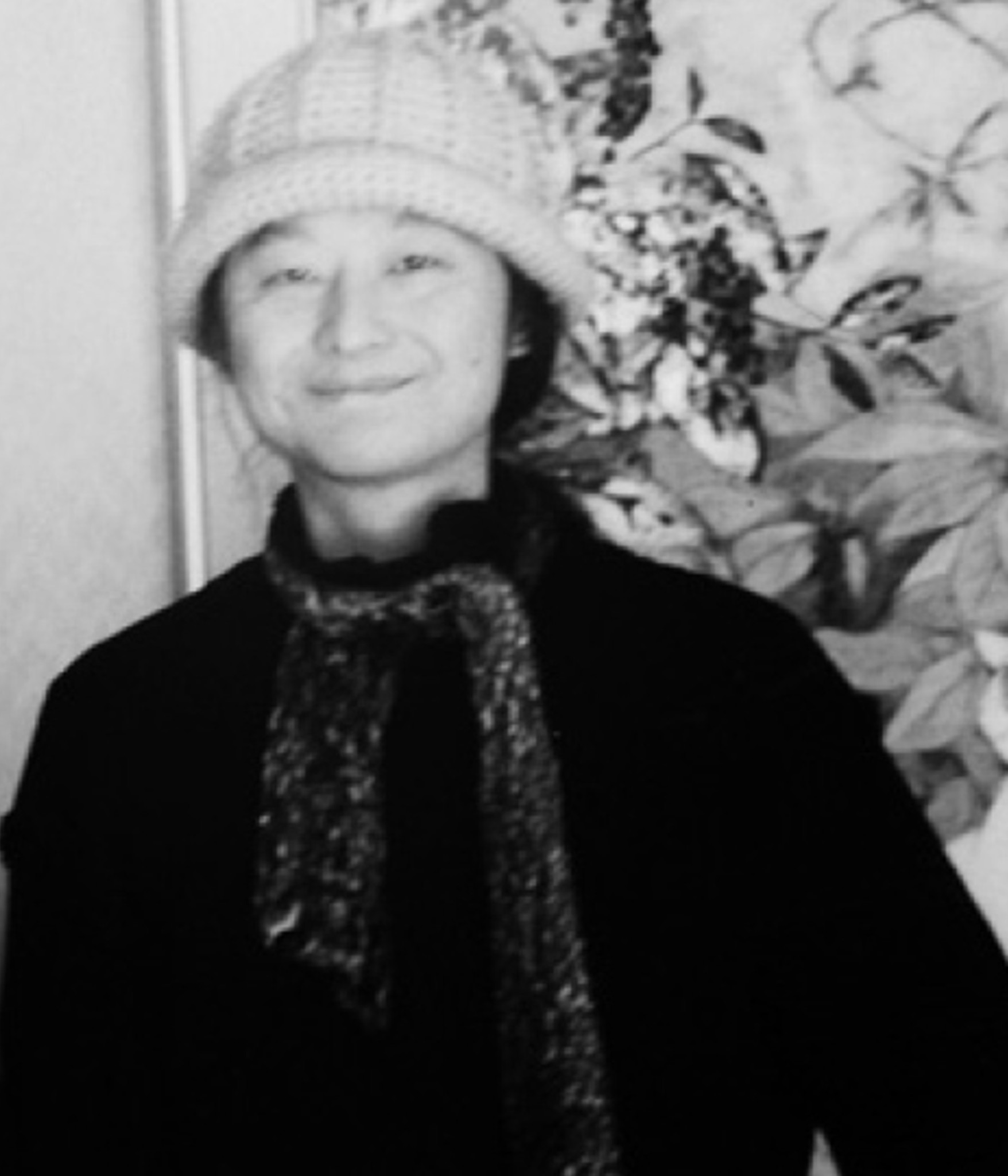
Shirō Sagisu, Japanese music composer

Many notable Japanese individuals from Young Japanese Baby Boom/Danso Generation were born in 1957, such as two former Japanese LDP Prime Ministers Shigeru Ishiba and Fumio Kishida, Issei Noro, Wakashimazu Mutsuo, Gakuryū Ishii, Yoko Akino, Fumi Saimon, Kōsuke Morita, Hiroko Kuniya, Satoshi Takebe, Mitsuko Horie, Shinobu Kitayama, Kazuko Fujita, Amii Ozaki, Izumi "Mimi" Kobayashi, Nobuyoshi Kuwano, Nobuteru Ishihara, Yoko Kawanami, Kenji Kawai, Kow Otani, Rino Katase, Koji Suzuki, Shinji Morisue, Yasuhiro Yamashita, Midori Kinouchi, Hiroshi Ono, Kazuyo Matsui, Kazunori Shinozuka, Shinobu Ōtake, Kazuya Kamiya, Shigeru Ban, Masahiro Hara, SoftBank founder Masayoshi Son, Nobumitsu Yuhara, Shirō Sagisu, Keiko Masuda, Keiko Toda, Tsuyoshi Ujiki, Kazunori Tamano, Tomoko Hoshino, Rumiko Takahashi, Gen Nakatani, Atsushi Ōnita, Jackie Sato, Yukihiko Imasaki, Akinobu Okada, Yumi Maruyama, Yutaka Hagawa, Gorō Matsui, Chō, Masako Natsume, Jūrōta Kosugi, and Hitomi Tohyama

=== January–March ===
- January 1 – Issei Noro, guitarist, songwriter, producer, and composer
- January 12 – Wakashimazu Mutsuo, former sumo wrestler
- January 15 – Gakuryu Ishii, director and writer
- January 18 – Yōko Akino, actress
- January 19 – Kimie Hatano, politician
  - Fumi Saimon, comic artist
  - Kimie Hatano, politician
- January 23 – Kōsuke Morita, experimental nuclear physicist
- January 25 – Michiharu Kusunoki, manga artist
- February 3 – Hiroko Kuniya, journalist and presenter
- February 4 – Shigeru Ishiba, former Prime Minister of Japan
- February 12 – Satoshi Takebe, musician, keyboardist, arranger, music director, and producer
- February 16 – Yuji Fujimoto, politician
- February 28 – Masayoshi Hamada, politician
- March 3 – Yoshinobu Murase, biathlete
- March 6 – Yoshiyuki Matsuoka, retired judo practitioner
- March 8 – Mitsuko Horie, actress, voice actress, and musician
- March 9 – Shinobu Kitayama, social psychologist
- March 10 – Yoshitaka Katori, former professional baseball pitcher
- March 13 – Yoshihiko Takahashi, former professional baseball pitcher
- March 18 – Kazuko Fujita, shōjo manga artist
- March 19 – Amii Ozaki, musician
- March 23 – Koji Okajima, figure skating coach and former competitive pair skater
- March 25 – Izumi "Mimi" Kobayashi, singer and composer

=== April–June ===
- April 2 – Kiyoshi Ejima, politician
- April 4 – Nobuyoshi Kuwano (a.k.a. Kuwa-man), television performer and former member of Rats & Star
- April 19 – Nobuteru Ishihara, politician and the son of Noriko and Shintaro Ishihara
- April 22 – Yoko Kawanami, voice actress (d. 2025)
- April 23 – Kenji Kawai, music composer and arranger
- May 1 – Kow Otani, music composer
- May 8 – Rino Katase, actress
- May 13 – Koji Suzuki, writer
- May 20 – Yoshihiko Noda, former Prime Minister of Japan
- May 22 – Shinji Morisue, gymnast
- June 1 – Yasuhiro Yamashita, chairman of Japan Olympic Comnitee and former judo-ka
- June 5 – Shinya Adachi, politician
- June 7 – Yasuko Watanabe, TEPCO worker (d. 1997)
- June 10
  - Hidetsugu Aneha, architect
  - Midori Kinouchi, retired idol musician, actress, and the wife of Naoto Takenaka
- June 22 – Tsuyoshi Fukui, retired tennis player and former Japan Davis Cup team member
- June 24 – Hiroshi Ono, video game artist (d. 2021)
- June 25 – Kazuyo Matsui, actress, investor, businesswoman, and essayist

=== July–September ===
- July 12 – Kazunori Shinozuka, former professional baseball player
- July 13 – Koji Yasumi, former rugby union player
- July 17 – Shinobu Ōtake, actress, musician, woman talent, and television presenter
- July 20 – Kazuya Kamiya, economist
- July 22 – Hitoshi Goto, politician
- July 26 – Yuko Asuka, actress (d. 2011)
- July 29 – Fumio Kishida, former Prime Minister of Japan
- July 30 – Kenyu Horiuchi, voice actor
- August 3 – Masayoshi Nataniya, politician
- August 5 – Shigeru Ban, architect
- August 8 – Masahiro Hara, engineer
- August 11
  - Kazuaki Ichimura, speed skater
  - Masayoshi Son, Korean-born Japanese entrepreneur, investor, philanthropist, and a co-founder of SoftBank Group
- August 14 – Nobumitsu Yuhara, professional golfer
- August 29 – Shirō Sagisu, composer
- September 1
  - Harumitsu Hamano, professional golfer
  - Masahiko Ito, businessman
- September 2 – Keiko Masuda, pop musician and actress
- September 4 – Etsuji Arai, politician
- September 8 – Yoshihiko Isozaki, politician
- September 12 – Keiko Toda, actress, voice actress, musician, and narrator
- September 16 – Hideo Higashikokubaru, former governor of Miyazaki Prefecture and comedian
- September 18 – Tsuyoshi Ujiki, actor and entertainer
- September 25 – Kazunori Tamano, tap dancer, choreographer, director, and writer

=== October–December ===
- October 3 – Tomoko Hoshino, actress and essayist
- October 4 – Yasuhiko Funago, politician
- October 5 – Junichi Usui, retired long jumper
- October 9 – Yōsuke Isozaki, politician
- October 10 – Rumiko Takahashi, manga artist
- October 14 – Gen Nakatani, politician
- October 15 – Kimio Sugimoto, former volleyball player
- October 16 – Tsuneyuki Nakajima, golfer
- October 25 – Atsushi Ōnita, politician and former wrestler
- October 30 – Jackie Sato, professional wrestler (d. 1999)
- November 8 – Koji Tomita, diplomat
- November 10 – Yukihiko Imasaki, Chief Justice of Japan
- November 11 – Manabu Matsuda, politician, finance bureaucrat, and university professor
- November 12 – Fumiko Takano, manga artist
- November 25 – Akinobu Okada, former baseball manager and player
- November 30 – Yumi Maruyama, former volleyball player
- December 8 – Yutaka Hagawa, professional golfer
- December 11 – Gorō Matsui, lyricist
- December 15 – Chō, voice actor
- December 17 – Masako Natsume, actress (d. 1985)
- December 19 – Jūrōta Kosugi, voice actor
- December 25 – Tadashi Maeda, banker
- December 28
  - Hisashi Yokoshima, retired racing driver
  - Hitomi Tohyama, musician

=== Unknown date ===
- Masao Yamamoto, freelance photographer

== Deaths ==
- January 18 – Tomitaro Makino, pioneering botanist (b. 1862)
- January 25
  - Ichizō Kobayashi, businessman, founded Hankyu Hanshin Holdings (b. 1873)
  - Kiyoshi Shiga, physician and bacteriologist (b. 1871)
- January 26 – Mamoru Shigemitsu, diplomat and politician (b. 1887)
- September 22 – Toyoda Soemu, Japanese admiral (b. 1885)
