= Kitao =

Kitao (written: 北尾) is a Japanese surname. Notable people with the surname include:

- Kanako Kitao (born 1982), Japanese-American synchronized swimmer
- Kōji Kitao (北尾 光司, born 1963), Japanese sumo wrestler and professional wrestler
- Madoka Kitao (北尾 まどか, born 1980), Japanese shogi player
- Masaru Kitao (北尾 勝, born 1961), Japanese animator
- Sagiri Kitao (北尾 早霧, born 1972), Japanese economist
- Kitao Shigemasa (北尾 重政, 1739–1820), Japanese ukiyo-e artist
- Teruhiro Kitao (北尾 光弘, born 1937), Japanese fencer

== See also ==
- 7954 Kitao, a main-belt asteroid
