= Kandori =

Kandori (written: 神取 or 香取) is a Japanese surname. Notable people with the surname include:

- Kyoko Kandori (神取恭子, born 1977), Japanese announcer
- Hideki Kandori (神取秀樹, born 1960), Japanese biophysicist
- Michihiro Kandori (神取道宏, born 1959), Japanese economist
- Mitsuko Kandori (香取光子, born 1943), Japanese gymnast
- Shinobu Kandori (神取 忍, born 1964), Japanese professional wrestler

== See also ==
- Kandori Bridge, a bridge in Ishinomaki, Miyagi Prefecture, Japan
