= Keiichiro Kobayashi =

Japanese economist

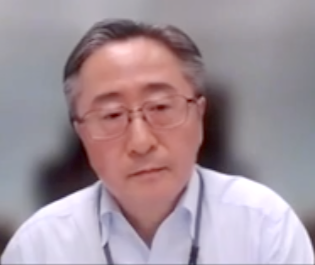
- In an online discussion in 2021
- Born: 1966 (age 59–60)
- Education: University of Tokyo; University of Chicago
- Occupation: Macroeconomist

Keiichiro Kobayashi (小林 慶一郎, Kobayashi Keiichirō) (born 1966) is a Japanese macroeconomist at the Keio University. His areas of expertise are endogenous growth theory, general equilibrium, business cycles, debt problems, debt control policy, and macropolitical economy. He received a Ph.D. in economics in 1998 from the University of Chicago. His dissertation The Division of Labor, the Extent of the Market, and Economic Growth was written under supervision of Robert Lucas, a prominent American economist and a Nobel Prize winner in Economics in 1995. Kobayashi was awarded the Nikkei Economics Book Award in 2001 and the Osaragi Jiro Critics Award in 2002, both for Trap of the Japanese Economy.

== Biography ==
Kobayashi is a professor of the Faculty of Economics at the Keio University. He is also a Faculty Fellow of the Research Institute of Economy, Trade and Industry, and a Research Director at the Canon Institute for Global Studies. He earned his master's degree in engineering from the School of Engineering, University of Tokyo, and a doctorate in economics from the University of Chicago. He worked at the Ministry of Economy, Trade and Industry and the Research Institute of Economy, Trade and Industry, and was a professor at the Institute of Economic Research of Hitotsubashi University before becoming a professor in the Faculty of Economics, Keio University.

=== Education ===
- 1991 – M.S., Mathematical Engineering, the University of Tokyo
- 1998 – Ph.D., Economics, the University of Chicago

=== Experience ===
- April 1991 – Joined the Ministry of International Trade and Industry (Japan)
- April 2001 – June 2007 Fellow, RIETI
- April 2003 – June 2007 Guest Editorial Writer, The Asahi Shimbun
- April 2005 – Visiting professor, Chuo University
- April 2007 – March 2009 Part-time Lecturer, Institute of Economic Research, Kyoto University
- June 2007 – March 2008 Executive Research Fellow, The Center for Global Communications (GLOCOM), International University of Japan
- June 2007 – March 2013 Senior Fellow, RIETI
- April 2009 – Senior Fellow, The Tokyo Foundation
- April 2009 – Research Director, Canon Institute for Global Studies
- August 2010 – March 2013 Professor, Institute of Economic Research, Hitotsubashi University
- April 2010 – September 2010 Special Visiting professor, Faculty of Economics, Graduate School of Economics, Keio University
- April 2013 – Professor, Faculty of Economics, Keio University
- April 2013 – Faculty Fellow, RIETI

== Bibliography ==
=== Published papers ===
- "Forbearance Lending: The Case of Japanese Firms", (with Toshitaka Sekine, Yumi Saita) Bank of Japan Monetary and Economic Studies (2003) 21(2):69-92.
- "A Theory of Debt Disorganizaiton", Journal of Restructuring Finance (2004) 1(1): 1–11.
- "Debt Disorganization in Japan", Japan and the World Economy (2005) 17:151-69.
- "Fiscal Consequences of Inflationary Policies", Journal of the Japanese and International Economies (2005) 19:386-93.
- "Business Cycle Accounting for the Japanese Economy", Japan and the World Economy (2006) 18(4): 418–440.
- "Forbearance Impedes Confidence Recovery", Journal of Macroeconomics (2007) 29(1): 178–188.
- "Payment Uncertainty and the Productivity Slowdown", Macroeconomic Dynamics (2007) 11(2): 231–248.

=== Books ===
- Debate on the Japanese Macroeconomic Policy (in Japanese, co-edited with Hiroshi Yoshikawa, et al.), Toyokeizai, 2000.
- Economics of Balance-Sheet Restructuring (in Japanese, co-edited with Mitsuhiro Fukao, Tatsuya Terazawa), Toyokeizai, 2001.
- Trap of the Japanese Economy (in Japanese, co-authored with Sota Kato), Nikkei Publishing, 2001.
- The Price of Escape (in Japanese), Nikkei Publishing, 2003.

=== Media coverage ===
- Debate on the Japan's Government debt (featured article, Nikkei newspaper) October 9, 2016
- Debate-Japan's Critical Fiscal Situation - Who takes this responsibility? (video, Nikkei newspaper) October 9, 2016
- Rational Expectation Hypothesis and the Next Issues (Economic Trend - Economics Lecture Series, Nikkei newspaper) February 20, 2017

=== Discussion/working papers ===
- Kobayashi Keiichiro, Saita Yumi, Sekine Toshitaka, "Forbearance Lending: A Case for Japanese Firms", Research and Statistics Department Discussion Paper Series 02-02, Bank of Japan, 2002.
- "Deposit Money Creation in Search Equilibrium", Research and Statistics Department Discussion Paper Series 02–04, Bank of Japan, 2002.
- "Japan's Lost Decade and the Complexity Externality (Revised)" (with Masaru Inaba), RIETI Discussion Paper Series 02-E-004, March 2002.
- "Forbearance Impedes Confidence Recovery," RIETI Discussion Paper Series 02-E-005, June 2002.
- "Fiscal Consequences of Inflationary Policies," RIETI Discussion Paper Series 02-E-010, September 2002.
- "Debt Deflation and Bank Recapitalization," RIETI Discussion Paper Series 03-E-007, February 2003.
- "Deflation Caused by Bank Insolvency," RIETI Discussion Paper Series 03-E-022, October 2003.
- "Monetary Cycles" (with Masaru Inaba), RIETI Discussion Paper Series 04-E-020, April 2004.
- "A key currency and a local currency? A simple theoretical model and its welfare implications," RIETI Discussion Paper Series 04-E-025, August 2004.
- "Is Financial Friction Irrelevant to the Great Depression? - Simple modification of the Carlstrom-Fuerst model-", RIETI Discussion Paper Series 04-E-030, September 2004.
- "Payment Uncertainty and the Productivity Slowdown," RIETI Discussion Paper Series 04-E-029, September 2004.
- "Payment Uncertainty, the Division of Labor, and Productivity Declines in Great Depressions", RIETI Discussion Paper Series 04-E-037, December 2004.
- "Forbearance Impedes Confidence Recovery (Revised)", RIETI Discussion Paper Series 5-E-002, February 2005.
- "Business Cycle Accounting for the Japanese Economy" (with Masaru Inaba), RIETI Discussion Paper Series 05-E-023, September 2005. Summary
- "Borrowing Constraints and Protracted Recessions" (with Masaru Inaba) RIETI Discussion Paper Series 06-E-011, March 2006. Summary
- "Transaction Services and Asset-price Bubbles (Revised)", RIETI Discussion Paper Series 06-E-010, March 2006. Summary
- "'Irrational exuberance' in the Pigou Cycle under Collateral Constraints" (with Masaru Inaba), RIETI Discussion Paper Series 06-E-015, March 2006. Summary
- "Bank Distress and Productivity of Borrowing Firms: Evidence from Japan" (with Fumio Akiyoshi), RIETI Discussion Paper Series 07-E-014, 2007.
- "Collateral Constraint and News-driven Cycles" (with Tomoyuki Nakajima and Masaru Inaba), RIETI Discussion Paper Series 07-E-013, 2007.
- "Disorganization due to Forbearance of Debt Restructuring", Working Paper.
- "Debt Overhang as a Delayed Penalty", MITI/RI Discussion Paper.
- The Division of Labor, the Extent of the Market, and Economic Growth (Ph.D. Dissertation), University of Chicago
- "Financial Crises and Assets as Media of Exchange"
- "Bad-Asset Theory of Financial Crises"
