= Koichi Hamada =

Koichi Hamada may refer to:

- Koichi Hamada (economist)
- Kōichi Hamada (politician)
