= Kiminori Matsuyama =

Japanese economist (born 1957)

Kiminori Matsuyama (松山公紀, Matsuyama Kiminori; born 19 November 1957) is a Japanese economist. He is a professor of economics at Northwestern University and, since December 2018, the chief scientific adviser of the Tokyo Foundation for Policy Research. He is also international senior fellow at the Canon Institute of Global Studies. He was awarded the Nakahara Prize from the Japanese Economic Association in 1996 and was elected a fellow of the Econometric Society in 1999, and a fellow of the Society for the Advancement of Economic Theory in 2011.

== Education ==
After receiving his BA in International Relations from the University of Tokyo in 1980, he received a PhD in economics from Harvard in 1987.

== Research ==
Matsuyama’s main fields of research are international trade and macroeconomics. In particular, he has worked extensively on such topics as north-south trade, economic growth, economic development, income inequality, structural change, and endogenous economic fluctuations. He is, in his own words, “interested in understanding the mechanisms behind macroeconomic instability, structural transformation, as well as inequality across countries, regions, and households, and how they interact with credit market imperfections and product market innovations.”
