= Shu Fujisawa =

Japanese writer

- Born: June 29, 1959 (age 67); Uchino, Nishikanbara, Niigata, Japan
- Education: Hosei University
- Writing career
- Notable work: Buenosu Airesu gozen reiji ("Midnight In Buenos Aires")

Shu Fujisawa (藤沢 周, Fujisawa Shū; born June 29, 1959) is a Japanese writer active during the late Shōwa and early Heisei period periods of Japan.

== Biography ==
Fujisawa was born in the former Uchino-machi (then in Nishikanbara District, Niigata Prefecture; now part of Nishi-ku, Niigata), and a graduate of the Literature Department of Hosei University.

In 1998, he was awarded the prestigious Akutagawa Prize for his novel Buenosu Airesu gozen reiji (Midnight In Buenos Aires).

He is currently working as a professor at Hosei University.
