= Takuma Yasui =

Japanese economist (1909–1995)

Takuma Yasui (安井 琢磨, Yasui Takuma; April 1, 1909 – December 17, 1995) was a Japanese economist known for his contributions to mathematical economics. In particular, he is recognized as one of the first economists to utilize Lyapunov stability theory for analyzing the stability of economic equilibria.

In 1970, he served as president of the Japanese Economic Association.
