= Rafael Robb =

Israeli-American convicted murderer (born 1950)

- רפאל רוב
- Born: October 31, 1950 (age 75)
- Spouse: Ellen Gregory Robb

Academic background
- Education: Hebrew University of Jerusalem; University of California, Los Angeles

Academic work
- Discipline: Game theory
- Website: Information at IDEAS / RePEc

Rafael Robb (Hebrew: רפאל רוב; born October 31, 1950) is an economist and former professor at the University of Pennsylvania who confessed to killing his wife in 2006.

== Academic career ==
Robb received his bachelor's degree from the Hebrew University of Jerusalem. He went on to obtain a Ph.D. in economics at UCLA. Robb joined the University of Pennsylvania faculty in 1984, and was a tenured professor at the time of his arrest in 2007.

Robb specialized in game theory, a mathematical discipline used to analyze political, economic, and military strategies. He has published numerous papers on game theory and other economic topics with scholars from Greece, Israel, Japan, and the US. In most of the papers, his family name is spelled as "Rob". He is also a fellow of the Econometric Society, one of the highest honors in economics.

== Personal life ==
Robb grew up in Israel, and emigrated to the US to pursue graduate studies. He met Ellen Gregory Robb, a sales manager, in 1987, and they married in 1990. They have one daughter.

== Killing of wife ==
Robb pleaded guilty in November 2007 to voluntary manslaughter in the high-profile death of his wife, Ellen Gregory Robb. She had been bludgeoned to death. Her death occurred on December 22, 2006, during an argument over the couple's divorce and the plans for their home in Upper Merion Township, Pennsylvania.

Robb was arrested on January 8, 2007, and charged with murder. The case was prosecuted by District Attorney (later County Commissioner specially appointed as prosecutor) Bruce Castor.

Robb pleaded guilty to manslaughter on November 26, 2007, and resigned from the university. Robb was sentenced on November 19, 2008, to a 10-year prison term, though the prosecutor asked for a sentence of 10 to 20 years. He sought parole after five years, as allowed by his sentence. The state board initially approved, and then rescinded, the request.

=== Civil case ===
Following Robb's guilty plea, Ellen Gregory Robb's family brought a civil wrongful death suit against him. In 2014, Robb was ordered to pay $124.26 million in compensatory and punitive damages to his deceased wife's estate, of which the sole beneficiary is his daughter. Robb then made an appeal to reduce this to $100 million, claiming that some of the evidence presented against him during the civil trial should not have been permitted as it unfairly influenced jurors against him.

Near the end of his prison sentence, Robb also requested access to frozen assets in order to pay for living expenses. Upon his release, he formally withdrew this plea.

=== Release ===
Robb was released from prison on January 8, 2017. After release, he moved to a suburb of Pittsburgh.

== Notable publications ==
- Michihiro Kandori, George J. Mailath, and Rafael Robb: "Learning, Mutation, and Long Run Equilibria in Games", Econometrica, Vol. 61, No. 1 (Jan. 1993), pp. 29–56
