= Sagiri Kitao =

Japanese economist (born 1972)

- 北尾 早霧
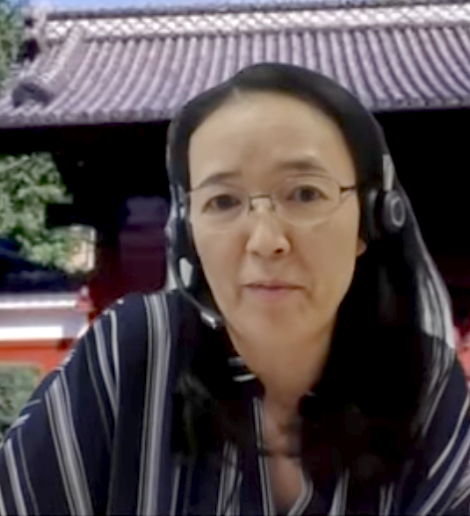
- In an online discussion in 2020
- Born: 1972 (age 53–54); Saitama, Japan

Academic background
- Education: New York University (Ph.D. 2007); Harvard University (MPA 2001); Waseda University (B.A. 1996)
- Doctoral advisor: Thomas J. Sargent; Gianluca Violante

Academic work
- Discipline: Macroeconomics; Public policy Social security
- Institutions: Keio University; City University of New York; Federal Reserve Bank of New York; University of Southern California
- Awards: Nakahara Prize (2016)
- Website: Information at IDEAS / RePEc

Sagiri Kitao (北尾 早霧, Kitao Sagiri; born 1972) is a Japanese economist at Asian Development Bank Institute and visiting professor at the National Graduate Institute for Policy Studies (GRIPS).

== Career ==
Kitao was born on 1972, in Saitama, Japan. She graduated from Waseda University in 1996. She worked for Goldman Sachs, originally in the Investment Banking Division, then moved to the Fixed Income Division, before leaving the company in 1999. After working for Goldman Sachs, she returned to school to further her education.

She received a Master of Public Administration in International Development in 2001 from the John F. Kennedy School of Government at Harvard University. Then she went to New York University and graduated with her Ph.D. in 2007 under the supervision of Thomas J. Sargent and Gianluca Violante. After graduating from NYU, Kitao served as an assistant professor at the University of Southern California (2007-2009). Then, she worked at the Federal Reserve Bank of New York as an economist, and later as a senior economist until 2011. Kitao then returned to the realm of academia. At the City University of New York, she worked as an associate professor in the Department of Economics (2011-2015) at Hunter College and the CUNY Graduate Center. She returned to Japan to become a professor at Keio University (2015-2018). Currently, she works as a senior research economist at the Asian Development Bank Institute in Tokyo.

She was awarded the Nakahara Prize in 2016, the first woman to be awarded the prize.

== Teaching ==
Kitao has taught many classes related to Macroeconomics at renowned universities, including NYU, USC, and the University of Tokyo. At NYU, she taught Macroeconomics and Advanced Macroeconomics in the doctoral program for Economics. At Keio University, in Japan, she instructed courses at the undergraduate and graduate level. The courses were focused around Macroeconomic topics including money, banking, and international economies. At the University of Tokyo, she instructed a course on International finance, at the undergraduate level, and Macroeconomic Models of Heterogenous Agents, at the graduate level. Her instruction has allowed her to teach at many high tier institutions.

== Research ==
Sagiri Kitao's research primarily focuses on the field of macroeconomics. She also studies topics including income taxation, wealth distribution and inequality, social security, health insurance, unemployment insurance, demographic transitions, disability insurance, entrepreneurship, and Japanese economy.

Sagiri Kitao has studied many macroeconomic topics. Her research history includes many research topics about Japan. Since 2015, she has published seven papers about different policies that affect Japan. Her most recent research is titled "Policy Uncertainty and Cost of Delaying Reform: The Case of Aging Japan" and was published in the Review of Economic Dynamics in January 2018. She has published two papers recently with Selahattin Imrohoroglu and Tomoaki Yamada. And in March 2017, she published "When Do We Start? Pension Reform in Aging Japan" in The Japanese Economic Review, which was based on her Nakahara Prize lecture. This paper discusses how specific reforms could raise the retirement age by three years could help reduce the replacement rate by 20%. She then discusses how delaying from 2020 to 2030 to 2040 can raise tax burden by 8% and lowers the welfare by 3% for future Japanese citizens.

Noticing the severity of Covid-19, Sagiri Kitao researched and published "Effects of the COVID-19 on the Labor Market and Inequality in Japan" (新型コロナ危機による労働市場への影響と格差の拡大) together with Shinnosuke Kikuchi and Minamo Mikoshiba. This paper discusses how current pandemic has impacted the labor market in Japan and intensifies the inequality within Japanese society. This paper is included in the chapter 15 of Economics of the COVID-19 Crisis, K. Kobayashi and M. Morikawa, Ed., Nikkei, 2020 (『コロナ危機の経済学』（小林・森川編）日本経済新聞出版、2020年).

== Selected publications ==
- Attanasio, Orazio; Kitao, Sagiri; Violante, Giovanni L. (2007). "Global demographic trends and social security reform". Journal of Monetary Economics. 54 (1): 144–198. doi:10.1016/j.jmoneco.2006.12.010.
- Conesa, Juan Carlos; Kitao, Sagiri; Krueger, Dirk (2009). "Taxing Capital? Not a Bad Idea after All!". American Economic Review. 99 (1): 25–48. doi:10.1257/aer.99.1.25. S2CID 2915689.
- İmrohoroğlu, Selahattin; Kitao, Sagiri; Tomoaki, Yamada (2019). "Fiscal sustainability in Japan: What to tackle?" (PDF). Journal of the Economics of Ageing. 14 100205. doi:10.1016/j.jeoa.2019.100205. S2CID 158572480.
- Kaito, Sagiri; Mikoshiba, Minamo (2020). "Females, the elderly, and also males: Demographic aging and macroeconomy in Japan" (PDF). Journal of the Japanese and International Economies. 56 101064. doi:10.1016/j.jjie.2020.101064. S2CID 213363792.
