= Nakahara Prize =

The Nakahara Prize (中原賞) is an annual award given by the Japanese Economic Association to Japanese economists under the age of 45 whose work has gained international recognition. The prize was created in 1995, and named after its sponsor Nobuyuki Nakahara. The aim of the prize is honoring and encouraging young (under 45 years) economists to publish internationally well-recognized papers and books. In 2016, Sagiri Kitao became the first woman awarded the prize.

== Recipients ==
Year	Recipients	University
1995	Fumio Hayashi	University of Tokyo
1996	Kiminori Matsuyama	Northwestern University
1997	Nobuhiro Kiyotaki	London School of Economics
1998	Kiyohiko Nishimura	University of Tokyo
1999	Akira Okada	Kyoto University
2000	Kazuya Kamiya	University of Tokyo
2001	Charles Horioka	Osaka University
2002	Michihiro Kandori	University of Tokyo
2003	Hideshi Itoh	Hitotsubashi University
2004	Hitoshi Matsushima	University of Tokyo
2005	Takeo Hoshi	University of California, San Diego
2006	Yuichi Kitamura	Yale University
2007	Akihiko Matsui	University of Tokyo
2008	Atsushi Kajii	Kyoto University
2009	Hideo Konishi	Boston College
2010	Takashi Kamihigashi	Kobe University
2011	Atsushi Inoue	North Carolina State University
2012	Mototsugu Shintani	Vanderbilt University
2013	Katsumi Shimotsu	University of Tokyo
2014	Kosuke Aoki	University of Tokyo
2015	Keisuke Hirano	University of Arizona
2016	Sagiri Kitao	University of Tokyo
2017	Hiroyuki Kasahara	University of British Columbia
2018	Toshihiko Mukoyama	University of Virginia
2019	Takashi Hayashi	University of Glasgow
2020	Ryo Okui	Seoul National University
2021	Fuhito Kojima	University of Tokyo
2022	Satoru Takahashi	National University of Singapore
2023	Toru Kitagawa	Brown University
2024	Sugaya Takuo	Stanford University
2025	Kei Kawai	University of California, Berkeley
2026	Yuichiro Kamada	University of California, Berkeley

== See also ==
- John Bates Clark Medal
- Yrjö Jahnsson Award
- Gossen Prize
- List of economics awards
