= Hosei University =

Top university in Tokyo, Japan

Coordinates: 35°41′44″N 139°44′29″E

- 法政大学
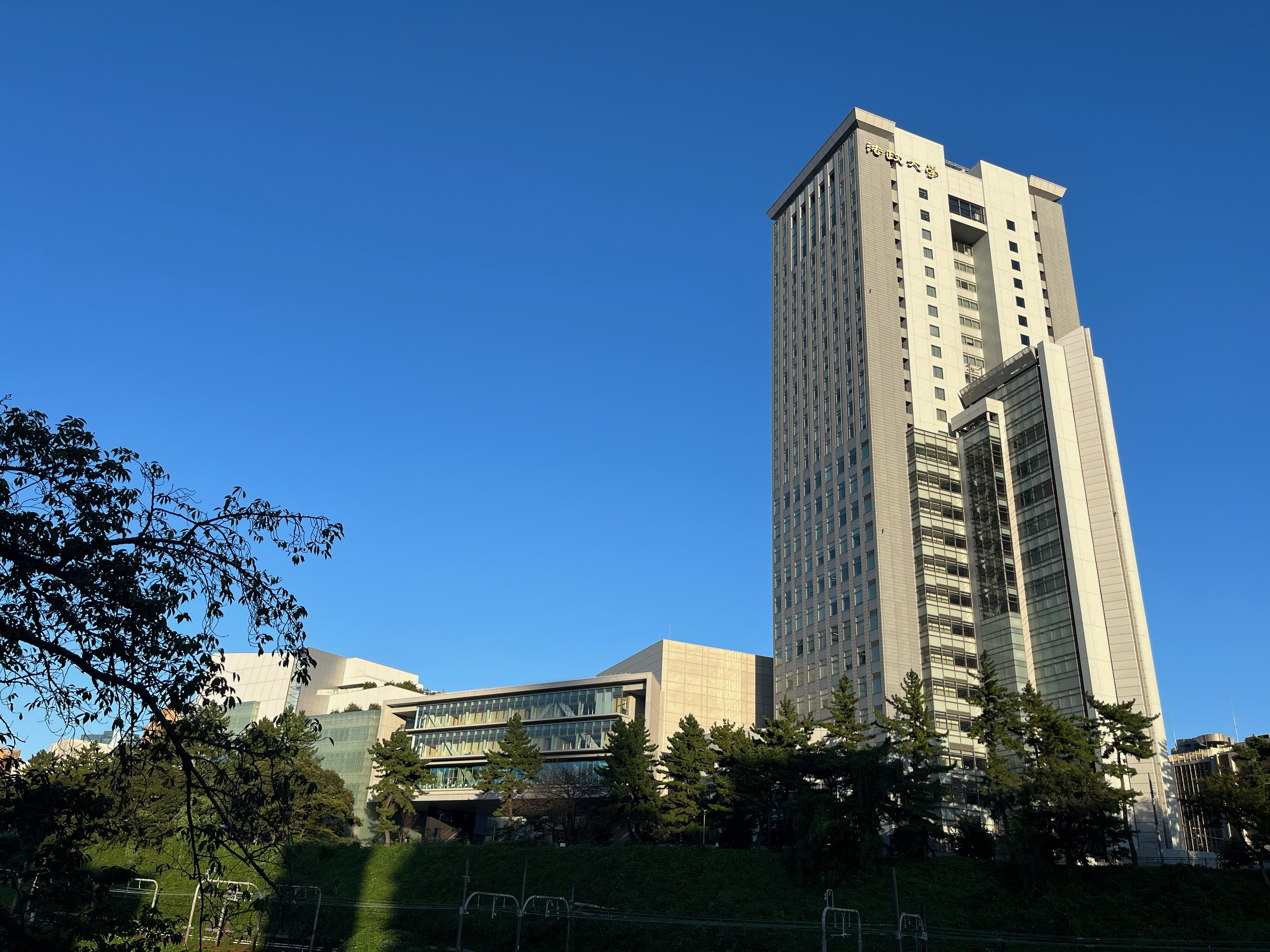
- Hosei University Boissonade Tower
- Latin: Universitas Hosei
- Type: Private Research University
- Established: 1880; 145 years ago
- President: Diana Khor
- Faculty: 746
- Undergraduates: 28,000
- Postgraduates: 2,007
- Location: Tokyo, Japan
- Campus: Urban and suburban
- Member of: Tokyo 6 Universities
- Colors: Orange and blue
- Nickname: Hosei Orange
- Sporting affiliations: Tokyo Big6 Baseball League
- Mascot: Ekopyon
- Website: www.hosei.ac.jp

Hosei University (法政大学, Hōsei Daigaku; lit. University of Law and Politics) formerly known as Tokyo University of Law (東京法学社, Tokyo Hogakusha) is a research university in Chiyoda, Tokyo, Japan. Hosei University and four other private universities in Tokyo are collectively known as MARCH.

The university is also a member of the Tokyo Big6 (東京六大学, Tokyo Roku Daigaku), which refers to six universities in Tokyo known for their historic rivalry in baseball. The Tokyo Big6 Baseball League was established in 1925. The league is known for players who go on to have careers in Japan's professional baseball leagues.

Hosei University is a member of the Top Global University Project (Top Type), funded by the Japanese Ministry of Education, Culture, Sports, Science and Technology (MEXT) in 2014. This program supports universities aiming to enhance their global competitiveness and internationalization.

== Overview ==
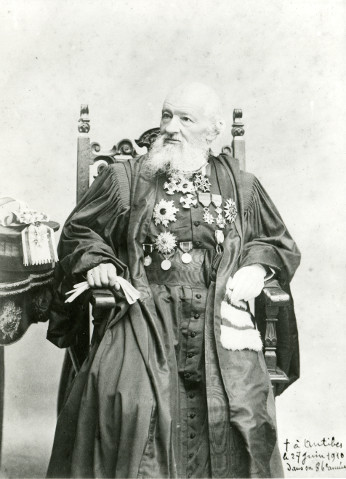
Gustave Émile Boissonade de Fontarabie

The university originated as a school of law, Tōkyō Hōgakusha (東京法学社, i.e. Tokyo association of law), established in 1880, and the following year renamed Tōkyō Hōgakkō (東京法学校, i.e. Tokyo school of law). This was from 1883 headed by Dr. Gustave Boissonade, and was heavily influenced by the French legal tradition. It merged in 1889 with a school of French studies, Tōkyō Futsugakkō (東京仏学校, i.e. Tokyo French school), that had been founded three years earlier. It adopted the name Hosei University (法政大学, Hōsei daigaku, i.e. university of law and politics) in 1903 and gained university status in 1920.

== History ==
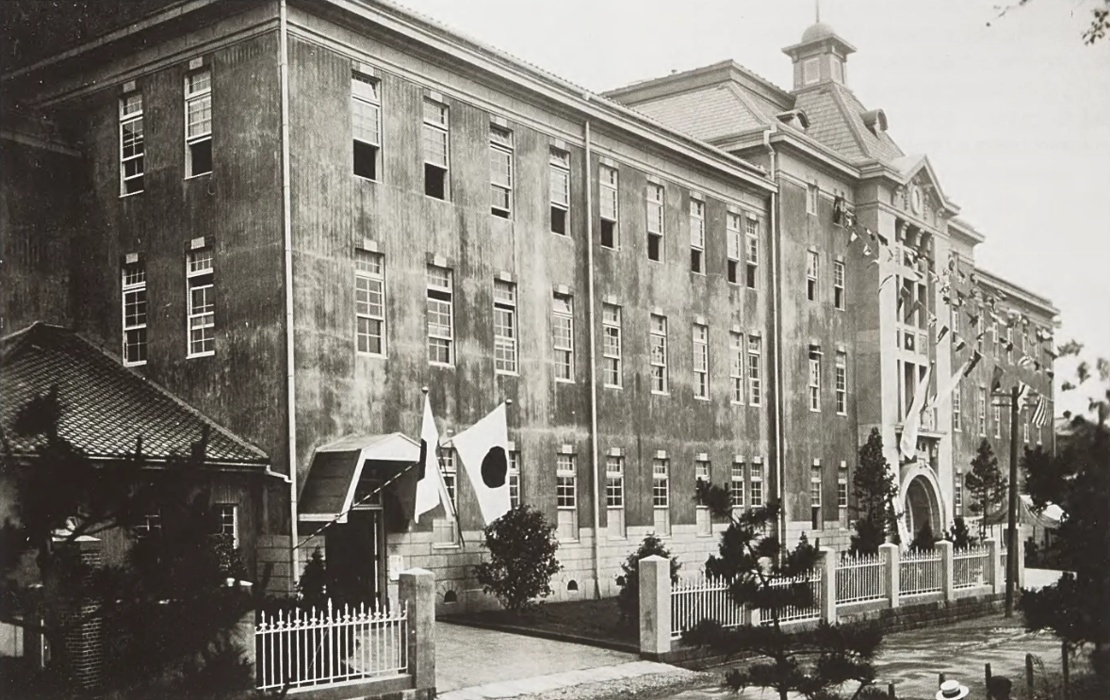
First Ichigaya school building in 1921.

Hosei University traces its roots to 1880 (Meiji 13), when Tokyo Hogakusha was founded in Surugadai, Tokyo, by Tetsu Kanamaru, Osamu Ito, and Masakuni Sattva. The institution emerged during Japan's liberal civil rights movement and the establishment of a modern legal system, focusing on training legal professionals. Its guiding principle of "liberty and progress" was inspired by the influence of French law, introduced by Gustave Boissonade, a French legal scholar invited to Japan to draft key legal codes and train lawyers.

In 1881 (Meiji 14), after the government banned private law schools, Tokyo Hogakusha briefly closed, but the Koho Bureau split off and renamed itself the Tokyo Law School in 1883 (Meiji 16), with Boissonade serving as vice principal. In 1889 (Meiji 22), the school merged with the Tokyo French School, established in 1886 (Meiji 19) by the French Society, becoming the Franco-Japanese Law School. Its first principal, Rinsho Minosaku, translated the French Civil Code and introduced key legal terms such as "rights," "duties," and "civil rights."

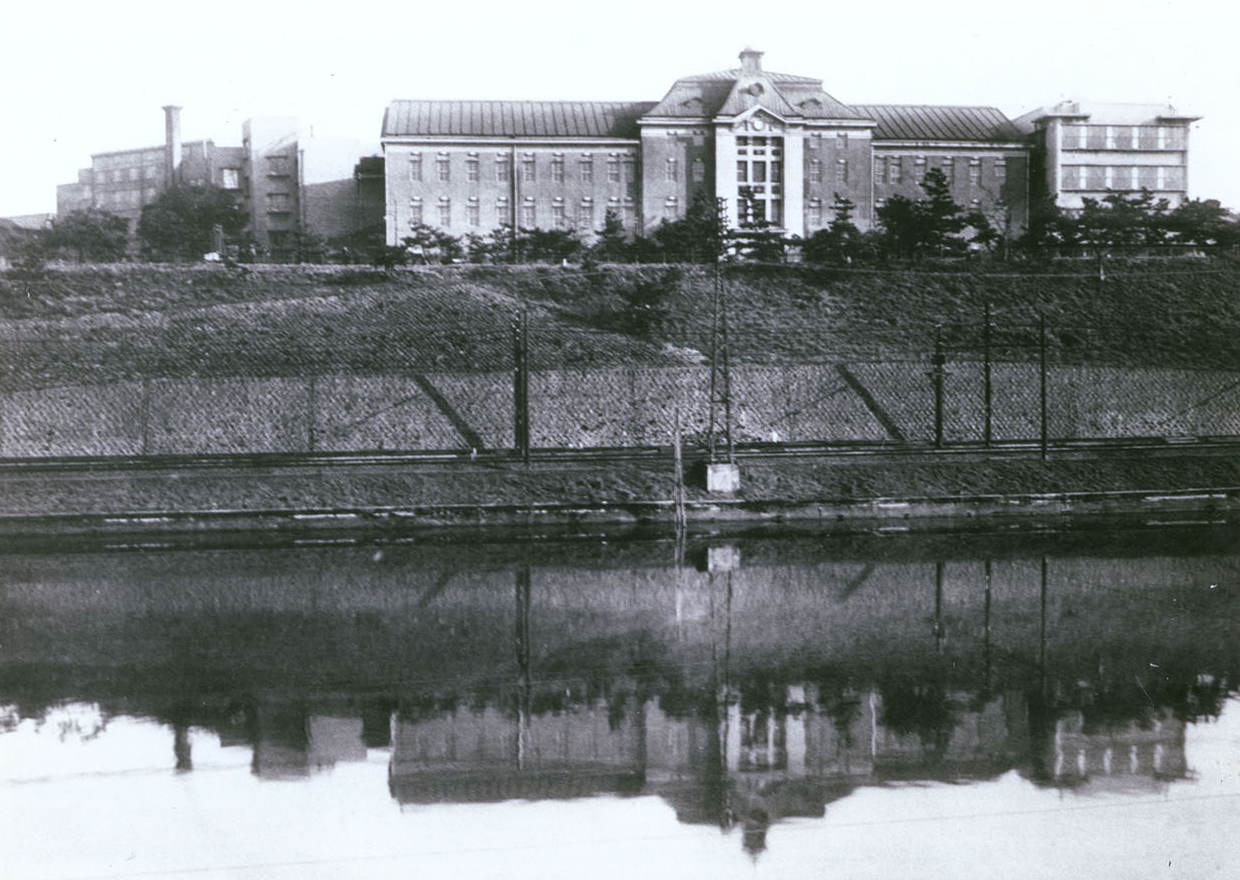
Fujimi school building (early Showa period) with its shadow reflected in the cool water.

In 1899 (Meiji 32), under principal Ume Kenjirō, the school implemented many reforms, launching advanced courses for continuing education, language programs in English, German, and French, and systems for independent study, auditing, and preferential enrolment. These reforms laid the foundation for the institution's growth.

In 1903 (Meiji 36), the school was renamed Hosei University under the Senmon Gakko Ordinance, offering preparatory courses for daytime students, university and specialized courses for evening students, and a graduate school of advanced studies. The university expanded further under Ume's leadership, embodying his philosophy of "open education."

In 1920 (Taisho 9), Hosei University gained official status as a private university under the University Ordinance. It initially included the Faculty of Law and Faculty of Economics, along with preparatory and professional studies. The university relocated to its current campus in Fujimi-cho, Tokyo, in 1921 (Taisho 10). By 1922 (Taisho 11), the Faculty of Letters was added, including departments such as Philosophy and Literature, and the university transitioned from night classes to full-time day programs with a dedicated faculty structure.

Today, it is a comprehensive institution with 15 faculties, 13 graduate schools, a School of Correspondence Education, and professional graduate schools.

== Faculty of Law and Faculty of Economics ==
The Faculty of Law traces its origins back to 1880, with the establishment of Tokyo Hogakusha, a school dedicated to training legal professionals during the transformative Meiji era. This period marked the modernization of Japan, including the adoption of Western legal systems, and the Faculty of Law played a key role in that movement. Influential in its early development was Dr. Gustave Emile Boissonade, a distinguished French legal scholar who served as a legal advisor to the Japanese government.

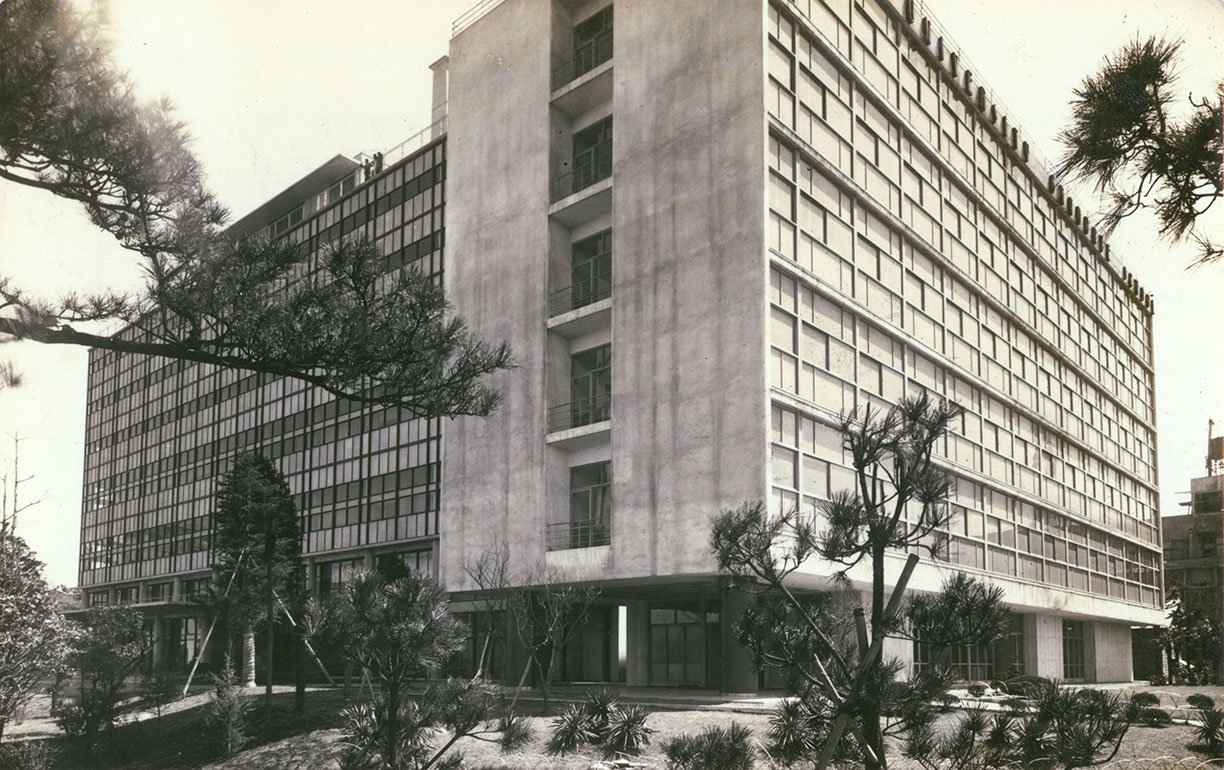
Hosei University 53' Building and 55' Building

The Faculty of Economics, established in 1920. Also, Hosei University still offers an economics program in English, which is called IGESS (Institute for Global Economics and Social Sciences). It also offers opportunities for international exchange.

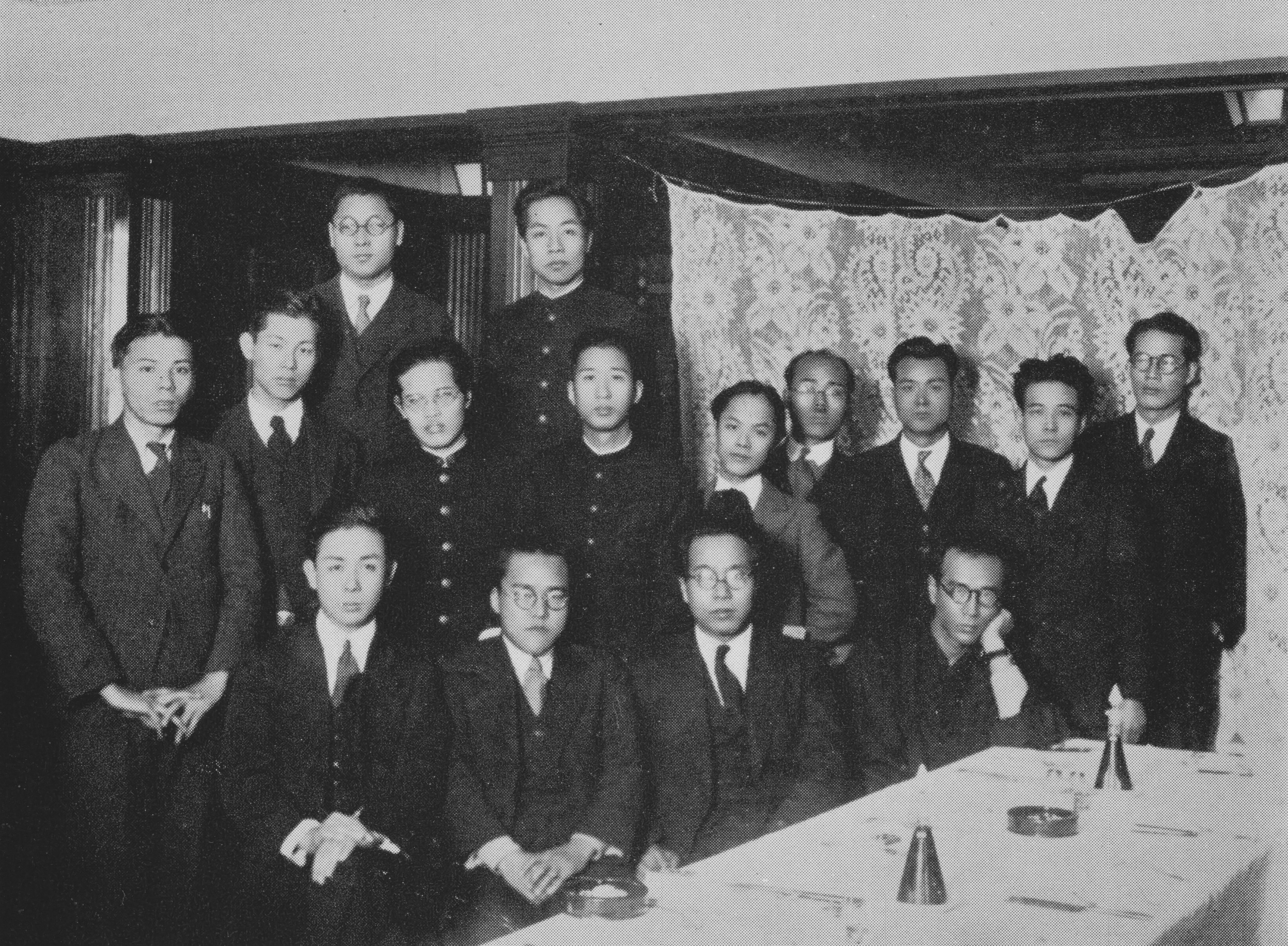
Kiyoshi Miki at Hosei University

== Campus ==
Hosei has three main campuses, which it calls Ichigaya, Koganei, and Tama. The Ichigaya campus is an urban campus halfway between Ichigaya and Iidabashi stations in central Tokyo; its 26-story Boissonade Tower, completed in 2000, can be seen from either station. The campus is located close to the Yasukuni Shrine. Natural sciences are studied at the Koganei campus to the west of Tokyo, and other subjects are split between Tama (located in Machida, which is near Hachiōji), and Ichigaya.

== Facilities ==
=== Ichigaya ===
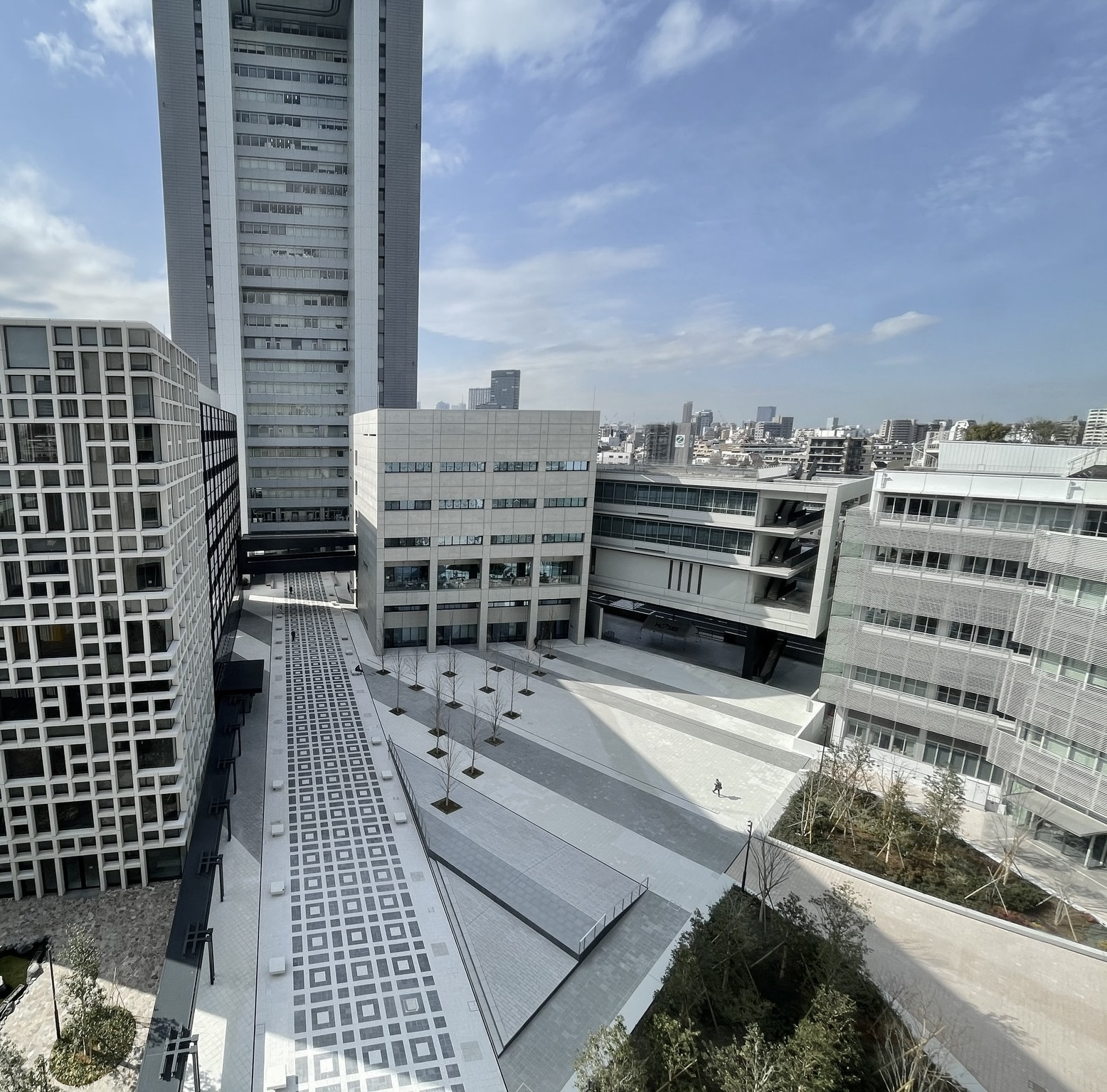
Ichigaya campus

==== Undergraduate ====
- Faculty of Law (法学部, Hōgakubu)
- Faculty of Letters (文学部, Bungakubu)
- Faculty of Business Administration (経営学部, Keieigakubu)
- Faculty of Intercultural Communication (国際文化学部, Kokusai-bunka-gakubu)
- Faculty of Sustainability Studies (人間環境学部, Ningen-kankyō-gakubu)
- Faculty of Lifelong Learning and Career Studies (キャリアデザイン学部, Kyaria-dezain-gakubu)
- Faculty of Engineering and Design (デザイン工学部, Dezain-kōgakubu)
- Faculty of Global and Interdisciplinary Studies (GIS, グローバル教養学部, Gurōbaru-kyōyō-gakubu) (from 2008)
- Sports Science Institute (SSI, スポーツサイエンスインスティテュート, Supōtsu-saiensu-insutityūto)

==== Graduate schools ====
- Graduate School of Humanities (人文科学研究科, Jinbun-kagaku-kenkyūka)
- Graduate School of Economics (経済学研究科, Keizaigaku-kenkyūka)
- Graduate School of Law (法学研究科, Hōgaku-kenkyūka)
- Graduate School of Politics (政治学研究科, Seijigaku-kenkyūka)
- Graduate School of Sociology (社会学研究科, Shakaigaku-kenkyūka)
- Graduate School of Business Administration (経営学研究科, Keieigaku-kenkyūka)
- Graduate School of Policy Sciences (政策科学研究科, Seisaku-kagaku-kenkyūka)
- Graduate School of Environmental Management (環境マネジメント研究科, Kankyō-manejimento-kenkyūka)
- Graduate School of Intercultural Communication (国際文化研究科, Kokusai-bunka-kenkyūka)
- International Japan-Studies Institute (国際日本学インスティテュート, Kokusai-nihongaku-insutityūto)
- Law School (法科大学院, Hōka-daigakuin)
- Business School of Innovation Management (イノベーション・マネジメント研究科, Inobēshon-manejimento-kenkyūka)

=== Tama ===
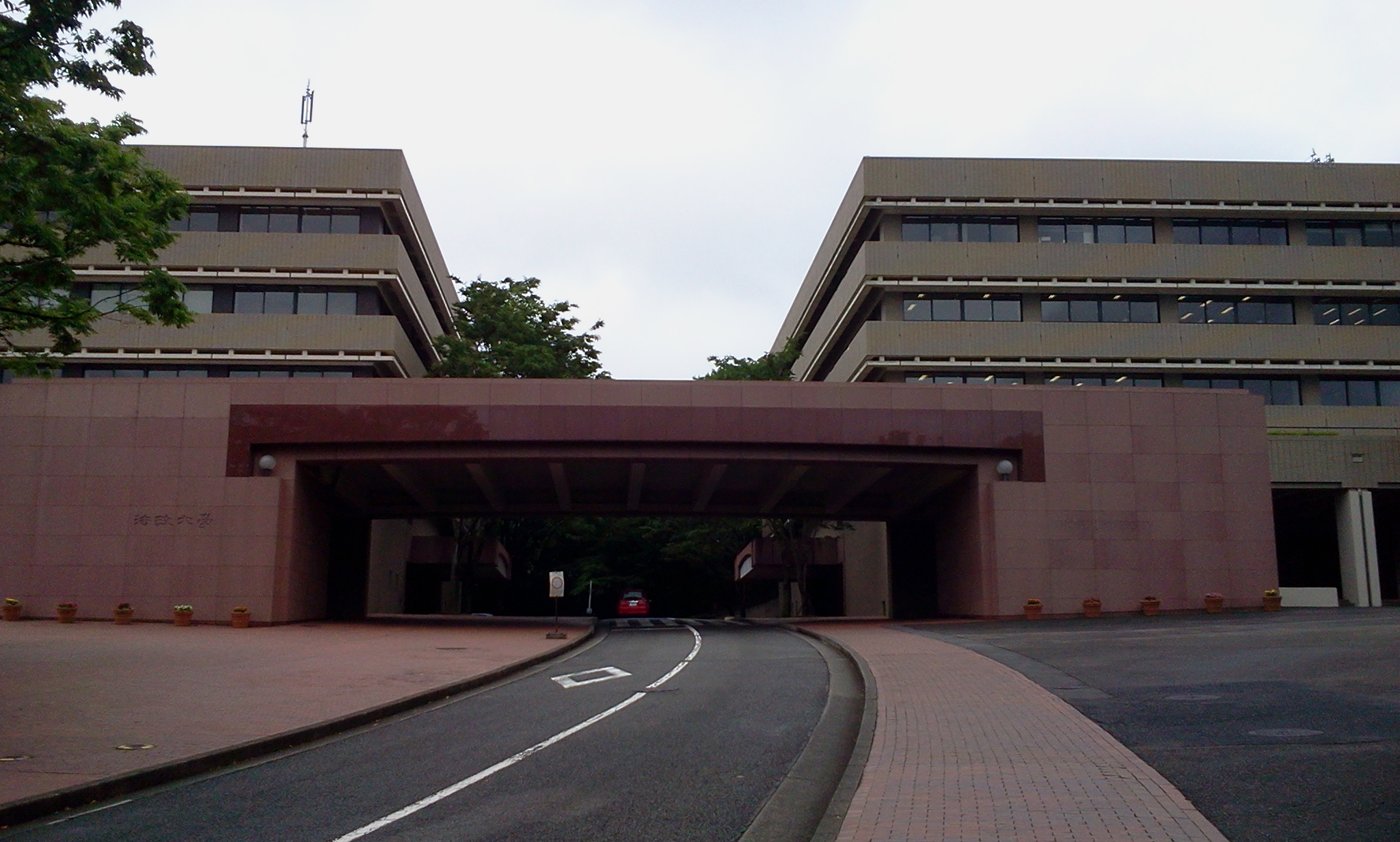
Hosei Tama Campus

- Faculty of Economics (経済学部, Keizaigakubu)
- Faculty of Social Sciences (社会学部, Shakaigakubu)
- Faculty of Social Policy and Administration (現代福祉学部, Gendai-fukushi-gakubu)
- Graduate School of Social Well-Being Studies (人間社会研究科, Ningen-shakai-kenkyūka)

=== Koganei ===
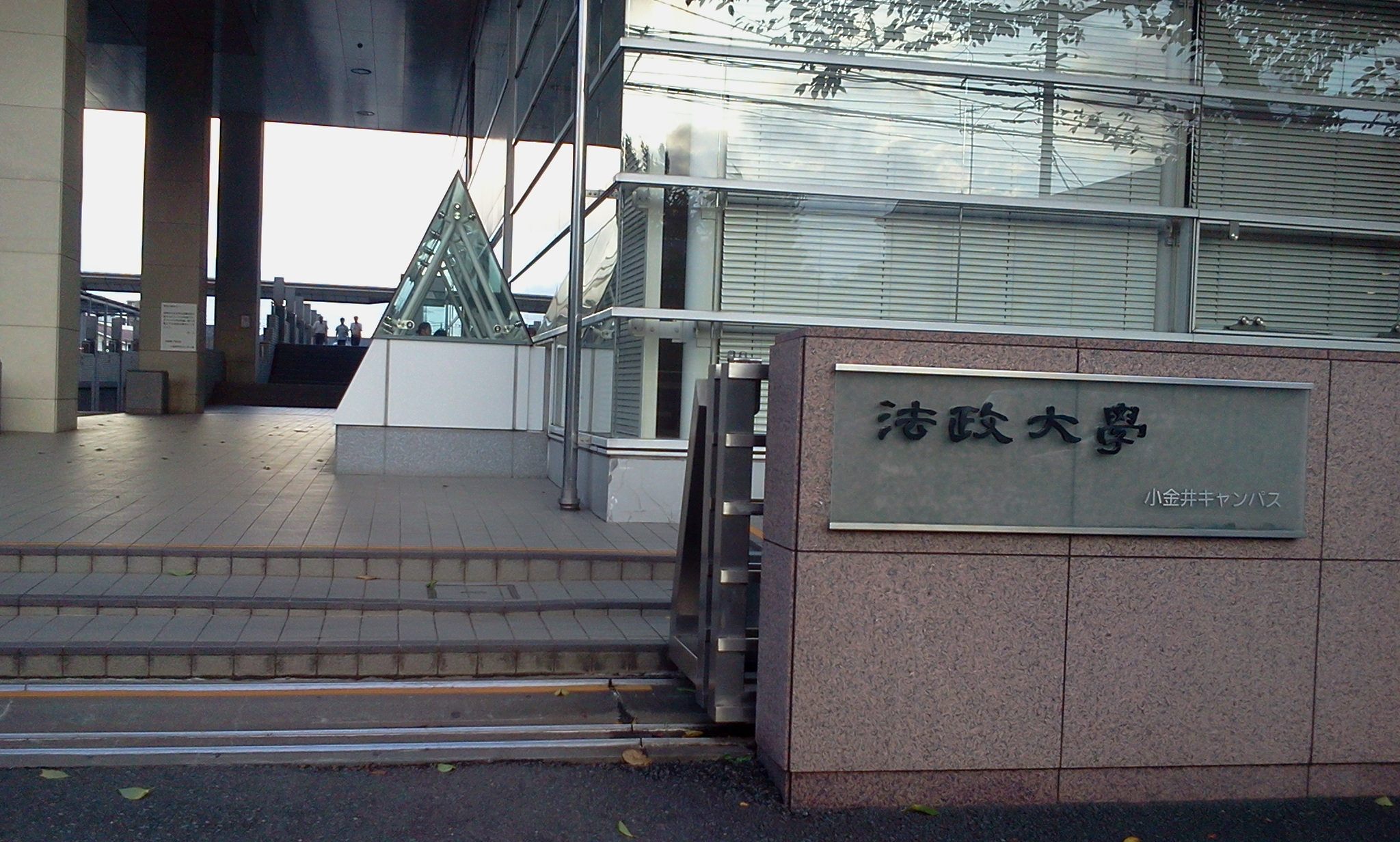
Koganei campus

- Faculty of Engineering (工学部, Kōgakubu) (being phased out)
- Faculty of Science and Engineering (理工学部, Rikōgakubu) (from 2008)
- Faculty of Bioscience and Applied Chemistry (生命科学部, Seimeikagakubu) (from 2008)
- Faculty of Computer and Information Science (情報科学部, Jōhōkagakubu)
- Graduate School of Engineering (工学研究科, Kōgaku-kenkyūka)
- Graduate School of Computer and Information Science (情報科学研究科, Jōhōkagaku-kenkyūka)

== Research Institutes ==
- Ōhara Institute for Social Research, Hosei University
- Nogami Memorial Hosei University Nohgaku Research Institute
- Hosei University Institute for Okinawan studies
- Boissonade Institute of Modern Law and politics
- Japan Statistics Research Institute of Hosei University
- Hosei University Research Center for International Japanese Studies

== Sports ==
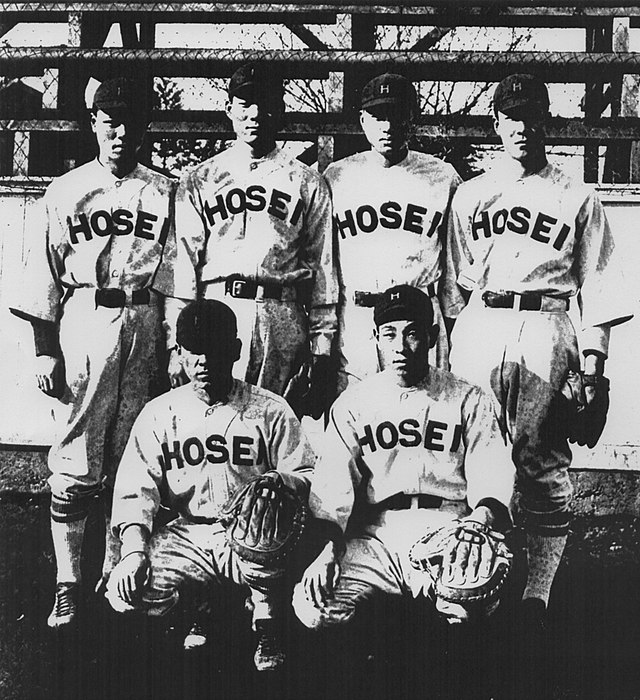
Hosei University Baseball Club players in 1931

Baseball (Hosei University Baseball Team):

American Football (Hosei Tomahawks):

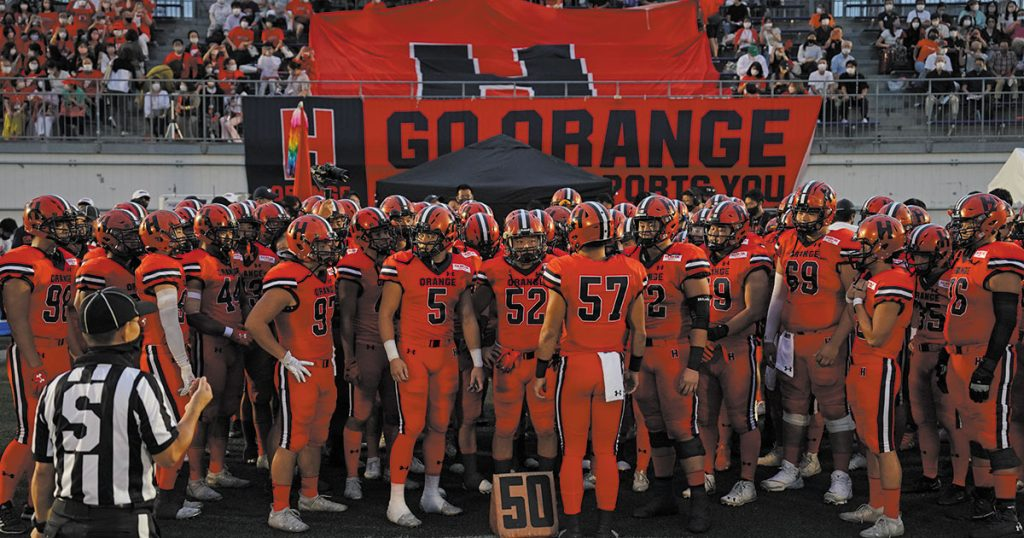
Hosei Tomahawks

== Notable alumni ==
=== Academia ===
- Sadayoshi Fukuda, philosopher and critic

=== Politics ===
- Yoshihide Suga, the 99th Prime Minister of Japan
- Kazunori Tanaka, Diet representative, Minister of Reconstruction (2019–2020)
- Kosuke Ito, Diet representative
- Hideo Jinpu, Diet representative
- Yukio Jitsukawa, Diet representative
- Emi Kaneko, Diet representative
- Taku Yamamoto, Diet representative
- Yoshio Yatsu, Diet representative
- Shinpei Matsushita, Member of the House of Councillors
- Hiroko Uehara, former mayor of Kunitachi City

=== Athletes ===
- Yukihiro Doi, racing cyclist
- Takuya Honda, football player
- Kairi Hojo, professional wrestler
- Takayuki Mikami, karateka
- Kyohei Morita, rugby player
- Yuka Sato, figure skater
- Tadashi Wakabayashi, baseball player
- Nishida Hiroki, Volleyball Player
- Keihan Takahashi, Volleyball Player
- Ayase Ueda, soccer player

=== Arts and Entertainment ===
- Mizuhito Akiyama, author
- Chiho Aoshima, artist
- Mew Azama, model and actress
- Satoshi Dezaki, anime director
- Shu Fujisawa, author
- Tomoko Hoshino, actress
- Norihiro Inoue, actor
- Mitsuaki Iwagō, photographer
- Hiroh Kikai, photographer
- Shin Kishida, actor*
- Hiroto Kōmoto, singer*
- Aki Maeda, actress
- Masao Maruyama, film producer
- Michiko Matsumoto, photographer
- Katsuhito Nakazato, photographer
- Kinoko Nasu, author
- Kouhei Kadono, author
- Midori Sawato, film narrator
- Haruka Takachiho, author
- Yōsuke Yamahata, photographer*
- Shuichi Yoshida, novelist
- Yasumi Matsuno, video game creator*
- Shōgo Yano, voice actor

=== Other ===
- Kenji Goto, journalist and writer
- Masahiro Hara, engineer
- Hu Han Min, Chinese Kuomintang politician
- Yoshiko Miya, journalist
- Yusuke Araki, FIFA football referee

* dropped out before graduation

== Notable faculty ==
- Sadateru Arikawa, aikido teacher
- Faubion Bowers, American academic
- Shu Fujisawa, writer
- Sadayoshi Fukuda
- Kojin Karatani, philosopher and literary critic
- Shunji Karube, athlete
- Kiyozō Kazama, professor of comparative linguistics
- Ume Kenjirō, legal scholar
- Ōmi Komaki, scholar and translator
- Taro Kono, politician
- Samezō Kuruma, economist
- Ryokichi Minobe, economist, educator and politician
- Shūmei Ōkawa, Japanese nationalist and Pan-Asianist writer
- Mitsukuri Rinsho, statesman and legal scholar
- Ishimoda Shō, historian
- Fujisawa Shu, writer
- Morita Sōhei, novelist and translator
- Hiroshi Takahashi, architect
- Jūji Tanabe, literature scholar, teacher, and mountain climber
- Hyakken Uchida, author and academic
- Tetsuro Watsuji, historian and philosopher
- Masahiro Hara, engineer, inventor of QR code

== Partner universities ==
- United States
  - Boston University
  - Baylor University
  - University of California, Davis
  - University of California, San Diego
  - Michigan State University
  - California State University, East Bay
  - Truman State University
  - University of Nevada, Reno
  - Boise State University
  - San Jose State University
  - Fontbonne University
  - San Diego State University
  - Southern California Institute of Architecture
  - University of Illinois
  - Gustavus Adolphus College
  - West Chester University
  - University of Wisconsin–Milwaukee
  - Minnesota State University, Mankato
  - Medaille College
  - Portland State University
  - Westfield State University
  - University of Utah
  - George Mason University
- China
  - Peking University
  - School of Government, Peking University
  - School of Humanities and Social Sciences, Tsinghua University
  - School of Social Sciences, Tsinghua University
  - University of Science and Technology of China
  - Shanghai Jiao Tong University
  - Wuhan University
  - Xiamen University
  - University of Science and Technology Beijing
  - Beijing Normal University
  - Capital Normal University
  - Shanghai International Studies University
  - Northeastern University (China)
  - State Administration of Foreign Experts Affairs
  - Chongqing Normal University
  - China Foreign Affairs University
  - Xi'an Jiaotong University
  - Beijing Jiaotong University
  - Beijing Foreign Studies University
  - Minzu University of China
  - School of Japanese and International Studies, BFSU
  - Shandong University of Finance and Economics
  - Dalian Nationalities University
  - Sichuan International Studies University
  - Liaoning University, College of International Relations
  - Fuzhou University
  - Dalian University of Foreign Languages
  - Software College of Jilin University
  - Xidian University
  - Huazhong University of Science & Technology
  - School of Software, Central South University
- India
  - Indian Institute of Science
- Indonesia
  - Sanata Dharma University
  - Bogor Agricultural University
  - Institute of Technology Sepuluh Nopember
- Uzbekistan
  - Samarkand State University
- South Korea
  - Yonsei University
  - Duksung Women's University
  - Sungkonghoe University
  - Seoul National University
  - Gachon University
  - Korea University
  - University of Seoul
  - Ewha Womans University
  - Inha University
  - Sungshin Women's University
  - Hankuk University of Foreign Studies
  - Chung-Ang University
  - Konkuk University
  - Kyonggi University
  - Busan University of Foreign Studies
  - Hoseo University
- Thailand
  - Thammasat University
  - Chulalongkorn University
- Ethiopia
  - Mekelle University
- Russia
  - Institute of Oriental Studies of the Russian Academy of Sciences
  - Moscow State University
  - Saint Petersburg State University
  - Petersburg State Transport University
  - National Research University – Higher School of Economics
  - Penza State University
- Algeria
  - University of Algiers
- United Kingdom
  - Royal Holloway, University of London
  - University of Sheffield
  - University of Reading
  - The University of Nottingham
  - University of Glasgow
  - University of Leeds
  - Newcastle University
  - University of Sussex
  - University of Bradford
  - The University of York
  - Birkbeck, University of London
  - University of Wolverhampton
- Australia
  - University of Sydney
  - The University of Adelaide
  - Monash University
  - James Cook University
  - Bond University
  - Australian Catholic University
- New Zealand
  - Massey University
  - The University of Auckland
- Canada
  - University of British Columbia
  - University of Alberta
  - University of Toronto
  - Brock University
  - York University
  - Trent University
  - University of Prince Edward Island
  - University of Victoria
- Ireland
  - University College Dublin
  - University of Limerick
- Vietnam
  - Ho Chi Minh City University of Technical Education
  - University of Social Sciences and Humanities - VNU
- Taiwan
  - National Sun Yat-sen University
  - Tamkang University
  - Wenzao Ursuline University of Languages
  - Chung Yuan Christian University
  - National Formosa University
  - National Yunlin University of Science and Technology
  - National Kaohsiung Normal University
  - Shih Chien University
  - National Taiwan Normal University
  - National Chengchi University
- Cambodia
  - Cambodian Mekong University
  - Royal University of Phnom Penh
- Laos
  - National University of Laos
- Malaysia
  - Asia Pacific University of Technology & Innovation
  - University of Malaya
  - University of Technology, Malaysia
  - UCSI University
  - Universiti Teknologi MARA
- Italy
  - Polytechnic University of Milan
  - University Carlo Cattaneo
  - Ca' Foscari University of Venice
- Austria
  - University of Vienna
- Switzerland
  - Swiss Federal Institute of Technology
  - University of St. Gallen
  - University of Zurich
- Spain
  - University of Barcelona
  - Institut Ramon Llull
- Czech Republic
  - Czech Technical University in Prague
- Germany
  - Humboldt University of Berlin
  - University of Oldenburg
  - Leuphana University of Lüneburg
  - Baden-Württemberg Cooperative State University
  - University of Bremen
  - Stuttgart Technology University of Applied Sciences
- Hungary
  - Corvinus University of Budapest
- France
  - Pantheon-Sorbonne University
  - Jean Moulin University Lyon 3
  - Catholic University of the West
  - Versailles Saint-Quentin-en-Yvelines University
  - Sciences Po Saint-Germain-en-Laye
  - Aix-Marseille University
  - University of Strasbourg
  - University of Toulouse II – Le Mirail
- Belgium
  - Karel de Grote University of Applied Sciences and Arts
- Argentina
  - National University of La Plata
- Mexico
  - Universidad Anáhuac México Norte
  - University of Guadalajara
