= Masanao Aoki =

Japanese engineer and economist (1931–2018)

- 青木 正直
- Born: May 14, 1931; Hiroshima, Japan
- Died: July 24, 2018 (aged 87)

Academic background
- Education: UCLA (Ph.D. 1960); University of Tokyo (B.A. 1955)

Academic work
- Discipline: Econophysics; Applied macroeconomics
- Institutions: UCLA; University of Illinois
- Website: Information at IDEAS / RePEc

Masanao Aoki (青木 正直, Aoki Masanao; May 14, 1931 – July 24, 2018) was a Japanese engineer and economist. He was a Professor emeritus of Economics at University of California, Los Angeles.

He earned a BA and MSc in physics from the University of Tokyo, and a PhD in engineering from UCLA in 1960. He was a professor of engineering at UCLA and California–Berkeley from 1960 to 1974, before switching fields to economics in which he remained a professor until his retirement in 2002. Aoki's change of research areas is reflected in the two editions of his influential textbook, Optimization of Stochastic Systems. Originally published in 1967 it contained a rigorous treatment of optimal control methods in engineering, whereas the second edition (published in 1989) was amended by numerous applications in economics. He died on July 24, 2018, aged 87.

== Selected publications ==
- Aoki, Masanao (1967). Optimization of Stochastic Systems: Topics in Discrete-time Systems. Mathematics in science and engineering. Vol. 32. New York: Academic Press. ISBN 9780120588503.

A revised edition: Aoki, Masanao (1989). Optimization of Stochastic Systems: Topics in Discrete-time Systems. Economic Theory, Econometrics, and Mathematical Economics (2nd ed.). New York: Academic Press. ISBN 9780120588510.

- Aoki, Masanao (1971). Introduction to Optimization Techniques: Fundamentals and Applications of Nonlinear Programming. Macmillan series in applied computer sciences. New York: Macmillan. ISBN 9780020303657.
- Aoki, Masanao (1976). Optimal control and system theory in dynamic economic analysis. Dynamic economics. Vol. 1. New York: North Holland Pub. Co. ISBN 9780720486032.
- Aoki, Masanao (1981). Dynamic analysis of open economies. New York: Academic Press. ISBN 9780120589401.
- Aoki, Masanao (1987). State space modeling of time series. Berlin; New York: Springer-Verlag. ISBN 9783540172567.
- Aoki, Masanao (1996). New Approaches to Macroeconomic Modeling: Evolutionary Stochastic Dynamics, Multiple Equilibria, and Externalities as Field Effects. Cambridge; New York: Cambridge University Press. ISBN 9780521482073.
- Aoki, Masanao (2002). Modeling aggregate behavior and fluctuations in economics: stochastic views of interacting agents. New York: Cambridge University Press. ISBN 9780521781268.
- Aoki, Masanao; Yoshikawa, Hiroshi (2007). Reconstructing macroeconomics: a perspective from statistical physics and combinatorial stochastic processes. Japan-U.S. Center Sanwa monographs on international financial markets. Cambridge; New York: Cambridge University Press. ISBN 9780521831062.
