= Kazuya Kamiya =

Japanese economist (born 1957)

- 神谷 和也
- Born: 20 July 1957 (age 69); Hamamatsu, Shizuoka, Japan

Academic background
- Education: Yale University (Ph.D. 1986); Osaka University (M.A. 1983); Kyoto University (B.A. 1981)

Academic work
- Discipline: Microeconomics; Mathematical Programming
- Institutions: Kobe University; University of Tokyo; Osaka University
- Awards: Nakahara Prize (2000)
- Website: Information at IDEAS / RePEc

Kazuya Kamiya (神谷 和也, Kamiya Kazuya; born 20 July 1957) is a Japanese economist. He is a professor at Kobe University.

== Career ==
Kamiya earned his B.A. from Kyoto University in 1981, his M.A. from Osaka University in 1983, and his Ph.D. from Yale University in 1986. He received the Nakahara Prize in 2000.

== Selected publications ==
- Kamiya, Kazuya (1988). "Existence and uniqueness of equilibria with increasing returns". Journal of Mathematical Economics. 17 (2–3): 149–178. doi:10.1016/0304-4068(88)90004-3.
- Kamiya, Kazuya (1990). "A globally stable price adjustment process". Econometrica. 58 (6): 1481–1485. doi:10.2307/2938327. JSTOR 2938327.
