= Tokyo Foundation =

Japanese think tank

- Native name: 東京財団 (Tōkyō Zaidan)
- Formerly: Tokyo Foundation for Policy Research
- Genre: Public policy think tank
- Founded: July 1, 1997
- Headquarters: Sasakawa Peace Foundation Bldg. 1-15-16 Toranomon, Minato-ku, Tokyo, Japan 105-0001
- Key people: Mieko Nakabayashi (President)
- Website: tkfd.or.jp/en

The Tokyo Foundation (Japanese 東京財団政策研究所 Tōkyō Zaidan Seisaku Kenkyūsho) is a Japanese public policy think tank. It is a private-sector, not-for-profit institute conducting independent research and analysis of public policy in Japan and other industrial nations. It is also engaged in leadership development.

== History ==
The Tokyo Foundation for Policy Research was founded on July 1, 1997, as the "Global Foundation for Research and Scholarship" with donations from the Japanese Shipbuilding Industry Foundation (now the Nippon Foundation) and Japan's boat-racing industry following authorization by the Minister of Transport (now the Minister of Land, Infrastructure, and Transport, and Tourism).

Nippon Foundation Chairman Yōhei Sasakawa serves as adviser to the president. Additional sources of its endowment at the time of its founding included 3 billion yen from the Ship and Ocean Foundation (now part of the Sasakawa Peace Foundation) and 8 billion yen from the Sasakawa Peace Foundation.

It was renamed the "Tokyo Foundation" in May 1999; became a public interest incorporated foundation on April 1, 2010, upon authorization by the Cabinet Office; and adopted the name, "The Tokyo Foundation for Policy Research," in February 2018 as part of its reorganization into a more research-intensive institute for evidenced-based, theoretically informed policy studies. It reorganized again in 2025, adopting the name it had previously gone by, The Tokyo Foundation.

== Past presidents ==
- Kimindo Kusaka
- Heizō Takenaka
- Hideki Katō
- Masahiro Akiyama
- Takeo Hoshi
- Izumi Kadono (since June 2018)

== Notable scholars and board members ==
- Katsuhito Iwai
- Gerald Curtis
- Yoriko Kawaguchi
- Keiichirō Kobayashi
- Shin’ichi Kitaoka
- Yōhei Sasakawa
- Toshihiko Fukui
- Masahiko Aoki
