= Asynchrony (game theory) =

In game theory, asynchrony refers to a gameplay structure where interactions and decisions do not occur in uniformly timed rounds. Unlike synchronous systems, where agents act in coordination with a shared timing mechanism, asynchronous systems lack a global clock, allowing agents to operate at independent and arbitrary speeds relative to one another. This flexibility introduces unique strategic dynamics and complexities to the study of decision-making in such environments.

For example, in an asynchronous online auction, bidders may place bids at any time before the auction ends, rather than in fixed, simultaneous turns, leading to unpredictable timing strategies and outcomes.
