= Fumio Hayashi =

Japanese economist (born 1952)

- 林 文夫
- Born: 18 April 1952 (age 74); Gifu, Japan

Academic background
- Education: Harvard University (PhD 1980); University of Tokyo (B.A. 1975)
- Doctoral advisor: Dale W. Jorgenson; Olivier Blanchard
- Influences: Takashi Negishi; Martin Feldstein; Edward C. Prescott; Christopher A. Sims

Academic work
- Discipline: Macroeconomics; Applied econometrics
- School or tradition: Neoclassical economics
- Institutions: List: GRIPS University of Chicago Hitotsubashi University University of Tokyo Columbia University University of Pennsylvania Osaka University University of Tsukuba Northwestern University
- Awards: Nakahara Prize (1995); Imperial Prize of the Japan Academy (2001)
- Website: Information at IDEAS / RePEc

Fumio Hayashi (林 文夫, Hayashi Fumio; born 18 April 1952) is a Japanese economist. He is a professor at the National Graduate Institute for Policy Studies (GRIPS) in Tokyo.

Hayashi received his Bachelor of Arts from the University of Tokyo and his PhD from Harvard University in 1980. He has taught at Northwestern University, the University of Tokyo, the University of Tsukuba, Osaka University, the University of Pennsylvania, Columbia University, Hitotsubashi University, and the University of Chicago.

Hayashi is the author of a standard graduate-level textbook on econometrics (Hayashi 2000).

He was a Fellow of the Econometric Society since 1988. He was awarded the inaugural Nakahara Prize in 1995. He was elected as foreign honorary member of the American Academy of Arts and Sciences in 2005 and the American Economic Association in 2020.

== Selected publications ==
=== Books ===
- Hayashi, Fumio (2000). Econometrics. Princeton, NJ: Princeton Univ. Press. ISBN 978-0-691-01018-2.
- Hayashi, Fumio (1997). Understanding Saving: Evidence from the United States and Japan. MIT Press. ISBN 978-0-262-08255-6.

=== Journal articles ===
- Hayashi, Fumio (1982). "Tobin's Marginal q and Average q: A Neoclassical Interpretation" (PDF). Econometrica. 50 (1): 213–224. doi:10.2307/1912538. JSTOR 1912538.
- Altonji, Joseph G.; Hayashi, Fumio; Kotlikoff, Laurence J. (1997). "Parental Altruism and Inter Vivos Transfers: Theory and Evidence" (PDF). Journal of Political Economy. 105 (6): 1121–1166. doi:10.1086/516388. S2CID 151201280.
- Hayashi, Fumio; Prescott, Edward C. (2002). "The 1990s in Japan: A Lost Decade". Review of Economic Dynamics. 5 (1): 206–235. doi:10.1006/redy.2001.0149. S2CID 53138432.
