= Koichi Hamada (economist) =

Japanese economist (born 1936)

- 浜田 宏一
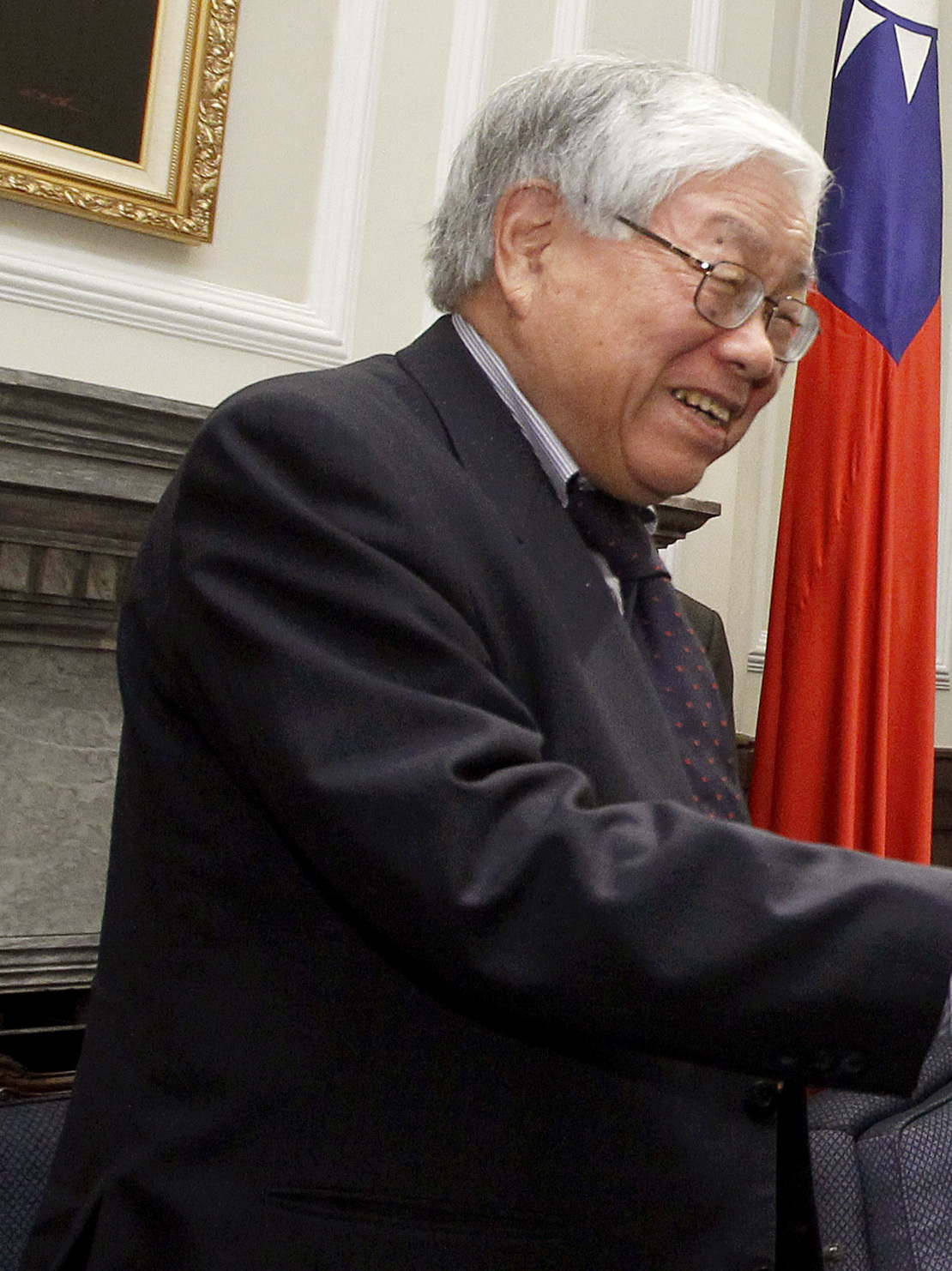
- Koichi Hamada in 2014
- Born: January 8, 1936 (age 90); Tokyo, Japan

Academic background
- Education: Yale University (Ph.D., M.A.); University of Tokyo (M.A., B.A., L.L.B.)
- Doctoral advisor: James Tobin
- Influences: Tjalling Koopmans

Academic work
- Discipline: International economics Law and economics
- Institutions: Yale University; University of Tokyo

Koichi Hamada (浜田 宏一, Hamada Kōichi; born 8 January 1936 in Tokyo) is the Tuntex Professor Emeritus of Economics at Yale University, where he specializes in the Japanese economy and international economics. Hamada also served as economic adviser to Japan's Prime Minister Shinzo Abe and is credited as one of the key architects of Abenomics, economic policies based upon "three arrows" of monetary easing, fiscal stimulus and structural reform. Hamada was president of the Economic and Social Research Institute in Japan's Cabinet Office from 2001 to 2003. At one time Hamada was also a contender to head the WTO.

== Biography ==
He passed the National Law Bar Examination (Shihoshiken) of Japan in 1957, L.L.B. in 1958 from the University of Tokyo, his B.A. and M.A. in economics at the University of Tokyo, 1960 and 1962 respectively, his M.A.and Ph.D. in economics from Yale University in 1964 and 1965 respectively.

His fields of interest are Labor economics, Macroeconomics, Applied Econometrics, School choice, The Black-White wealth gap, Wage determination, Economic links among relatives, Immigration, and Changes in labor force quality. His specialized fields of interest are Game Theoretic Approach to International Policy Coordination, Microfoundation of International Capital Movements, Positive Analysis of the Emergence of International Economic Order, Effects of a Free Trade Area and Law and Economics in Japan. He writes a monthly syndicated column at Project Syndicate.

== Honors ==
Hamada was awarded the Order of the Sacred Treasure, Gold and Silver Star, which is Japan's second-highest honor of its kind and the highest honor given to a civil servant.

- Fellow of the Econometric Society and served as its council member from 1980 to 1985.
- President of the Japanese Association of Economics and Econometrics (now the Japanese Economic Association) from 1994 to 1995.
- The founding President of the Japan Law and Economics Association in 2003 (now its honorary fellow).
- Abe Fellow, Social Science Research Council, 2009.

== Selected publications ==
- Hamada, Koichi (1966). "Strategic Aspects of Taxation on Foreign Investment Income". Quarterly Journal of Economics. 80 (3): 361–375. doi:10.2307/1880725. JSTOR 1880725.
- Hamada, Koichi (1967). "On the Optimal Transfer and Income Distribution in a Growing Economy". Review of Economic Studies. 34 (3): 295–299. doi:10.2307/2296677. JSTOR 2296677.
- Bhagwati, Jagdish; Hamada, Koichi (1974). "The brain drain, international integration of markets for professionals and unemployment: A theoretical analysis". Journal of Development Economics. 1 (1): 19–42. doi:10.1016/0304-3878(74)90020-0.
- Hamada, Koichi (1974). "An economic analysis of the duty-free zone". Journal of International Economics. 4 (3): 225–241. doi:10.1016/0022-1996(74)90044-0.
- Hamada, Koichi (1976). "A Strategic Analysis of Monetary Interdependence". Journal of Political Economy. 84 (4): 677–700. doi:10.1086/260471. JSTOR 1831327. S2CID 153631025.
- Hamada, Koichi; Okada, Yasushi (2009). "Monetary and international factors behind Japan's lost decade". Journal of the Japanese and International Economies. 23 (2): 200–219. doi:10.1016/j.jjie.2009.01.004.
