= Tomoko Hoshino =

Japanese actress and essayist (born 1957)

- Born: 3 October 1957 (age 68); Nagaoka
- Citizenship: Japan
- Education: Hosei University
- Occupations: actress and essayist

Tomoko Hoshino (星野 知子, Hoshino Tomoko; born October 3, 1957 in Nagaoka, Niigata) is a Japanese actress and essayist. She graduated from Hosei University.
