= Masahiro Hara =

Japanese inventor of the QR code (born 1957)

- 原 昌宏
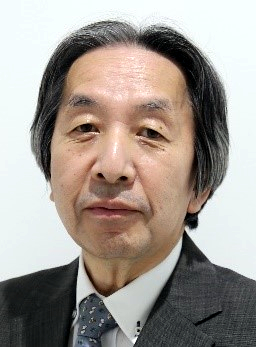
- Masahiro Hara
- Born: August 8, 1957 (age 69); Tokyo, Japan
- Education: Hosei University
- Known for: Inventing the QR code
- Awards: European Inventor Award

Masahiro Hara (Japanese: 原 昌宏, Hepburn: Hara Masahiro, born on August 8, 1957) is a Japanese engineer and Hosei University graduate who is best known for inventing the QR code in 1994.

== Early life and education ==
Hara was born in Tokyo in 1957. He studied in the department of electric and electronic engineering at Hosei University. He graduated in 1980.

== Career ==
Example of a QR code for mobile English Wikipedia

=== Denso and QR code invention ===
After graduating from Hosei University, Hara worked at Denso, a Toyota Group subsidiary, where he began developing a barcode system. In 1992, at Denso's development department (later Denso Wave), he was tasked with creating a new 2D code to efficiently track automotive components. One day during a lunchtime game of go, he realized the black-and-white patterns could encode information. He also researched publications to find a unique proportion for the position pattern to ensure readability. The code was introduced in 1994.

In 2021, QR codes were being used to book and track COVID-19 tests and contact tracing. Hara has stated that he would like to develop QR codes for additional medical purposes, including imaging such as x-rays or electrocardiogram data. Hara still works for Denso as of 2024.

=== Japan International Cooperation Agency ===
Hara was the chief engineer and advisor for a Japan International Cooperation Agency's "School For All" program to improve education in Niger.

== Selected publications ==
- Co-author of chapters 7 & 12 of "Educational development through community-wide collaboration", 2020 book "Community Participation with Schools in Developing Countries". ISBN 9780429057472

== Awards ==
Masahiro Hara has been widely recognized for his revolutionary invention of the QR code, which has transformed industries across the globe. In 2014, he and the inventors of the QR code development team were awarded the European Inventor Award. The 2014 award ceremony took place on June 17 in Berlin, at Deutsche Telekom's Berlin Representative Office (Former Kaiserliches Telegrafenamt), in honor of the 20th anniversary of the invention.

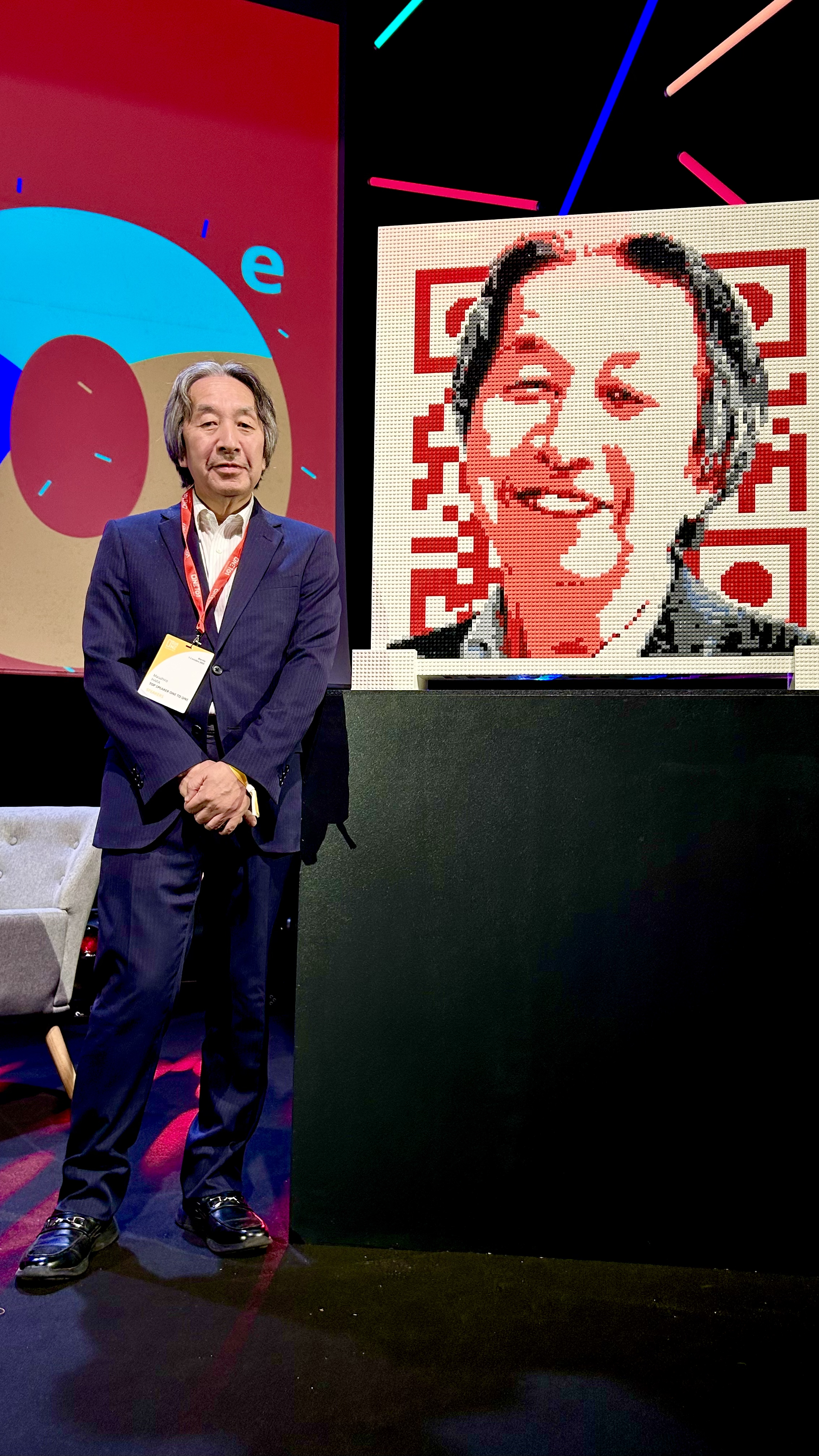
Hara and his portrait made with Lego by the French artist qargo

In October 2024, Masahiro Hara made his first visit to France to celebrate the 30th anniversary of his invention. He was invited by his friend, contemporary artist qargo, one of the pioneers in incorporating QR codes into art. Hara was the guest of honor at the 10th edition of the 1to1 Experience Client event in Biarritz, held from October 1 to 3, where he shared the story of the QR code's creation. Hara highlighted how QR codes have transformed various sectors, from facilitating over 2 billion daily payments in China to being used for electronic ticketing and everyday smartphone applications.

During the event, qargo unveiled a special artwork dedicated to Hara to mark this technological milestone. Hara humorously mentioned that he can still decode a QR code manually using just paper and pencil.

He also discussed the future potential of QR codes, envisioning colored versions capable of storing up to 7,000 characters, including short videos, directly viewable on the code.

A world QR code day was created on August 8, in honor of the date of birth of its inventor.
