= Michihiro Kandori =

Japanese economist (born 1959)

- 神取 道宏
- Born: 21 August 1959 (age 67); Sapporo, Japan

Academic background
- Education: Stanford University (Ph.D. 1989); University of Tokyo (B.A. 1982)
- Doctoral advisor: Paul Milgrom
- Influences: Takashi Negishi

Academic work
- Discipline: Microeconomic theory Game theory
- Institutions: University of Tokyo; Princeton University; University of Pennsylvania
- Awards: Nakahara Prize (2002); R. K. Cho Economics Prize (2017)
- Website: Information at IDEAS / RePEc

Michihiro Kandori (神取道宏, Kandori Michihiro; born 21 August 1959) is a Japanese economist. He is a professor at the University of Tokyo. Kandori is the President of the Game Theory Society, replacing Matthew O. Jackson in 2023.

== Career ==
He received a B.A. from University of Tokyo in 1982 and a PhD from Stanford University in 1989. His seminal papers about social norms (1992) and evolutionary game theory (1993) together have received 5,000 citations to date, according to Google Scholar. Kandori serves as the vice director of the University of Tokyo Market Design Center.

== Recognition ==
- 1999: Fellow, Econometric Society
- 2002: Japanese Economic Association-Nakahara Prize
- 2017: R. K. Cho Economics Prize
- 2017: Fellow, Game Theory Society

== Selected publications ==
- Kandori, Michihiro (1992). "Social Norms and Community Enforcement" (PDF). Review of Economic Studies. 59 (1): 63–80. doi:10.2307/2297925. JSTOR 2297925.
- Kandori, Michihiro (1992). "Repeated Games Played by Overlapping Generations of Players". Review of Economic Studies. 59 (1): 81–92. doi:10.2307/2297926. JSTOR 2297926.
- Kandori, Michihiro; Mailath, George J.; Rob, Rafael (1993). "Learning, mutation, and long run equilibria in games". Econometrica. 61 (1): 29–56. doi:10.2307/2951777. JSTOR 2951777.
- Kandori, Michihiro; Rob, Rafael (1995). "Evolution of Equilibria in the Long Run: A General Theory and Applications" (PDF). Journal of Economic Theory. 65 (2): 383–414. doi:10.1006/jeth.1995.1014.
- Kandori, Michihiro; Matsushima, Hitoshi (1998). "Private Observation, Communication and Collusion". Econometrica. 66 (3): 627–652. doi:10.2307/2998577. JSTOR 2998577.
- Kandori, Michihiro (2002). "Introduction to Repeated Games with Private Monitoring". Journal of Economic Theory. 102 (1): 1–5. doi:10.1006/jeth.2001.2853.
- Kandori, Michihiro (2003). "Randomization, Communication, and Efficiency in Repeated Games with Imperfect Public Monitoring". Econometrica. 71 (1): 345–353. doi:10.1111/1468-0262.00398. JSTOR 3082049.
- Kandori, Michihiro; Obara, Ichiro (2006). "Efficiency in Repeated Games Revisited: The Role of Private Strategies". Econometrica. 74 (2): 499–519. doi:10.1111/j.1468-0262.2006.00669.x. JSTOR 3598808.
