= The Japanese Economic Review =

- Discipline: Economics
- Language: English
- Edited by: Hidehiko Ichimura

Publication details
- Former name: The Economic Studies Quarterly
- History: 1959-present
- Publisher: Wiley-Blackwell
- Frequency: Quarterly
- Impact factor: 0.389 (2019)

Standard abbreviations
- ISO 4: Jpn. Econ. Rev.

Indexing
- ISSN: 1352-4739 (print); 1468-5876 (web)
- LCCN: 95659610
- OCLC no.: 39071102

Links
- Journal homepage; Online access; Online archive

The Japanese Economic Review is a peer-reviewed academic journal of economics published since 1959 by the Japanese Economic Association. It was formerly called The Economic Studies Quarterly.

== Abstracting and indexing ==
According to the Journal Citation Reports, the journal has a 2014 impact factor of 0.351, ranking it 275th out of 333 journals in the category "Economics".

== See also ==
- List of economics journals
