= Nakai Riken =

Nakai Riken (中井 履軒, Riken Nakai; 1732–1817) was a leading academic in the Kaitokudo academy tradition of scholarship. He was the younger son of Nakai Shuan (1758 d.), one of the Kaitokudo's two founding leaders, and was influenced by his teacher and mentor Goi Ranju. His intellectualised way of being led to continued engagement with but physical separation from the Kaitokudo. Much is made of his demeanor reflecting his.

Often stated as analogous to his floating calligraphic style Riken was vastly different in demeanour to his brother Nakai Chikuzan, although their underlying epistemologies, beliefs and degree of tenacious individualism were similar. They both furthered the work of Goi Ranju and consolidating previous thought around the Kaitokudo school, bringing a level of prestige to the academy.

Like his brother Chikuzan, Riken wholeheartedly denounced Ogyū Sorai and contended that all people have potential, to the extent that "even" commoners could become scholars, while he also denounced religion and superstition. However, Riken’s particular strain of the dismissal of dreams, and the unverifiable led him to dabble in astronomy, most notably with Asada Goryu.

Riken’s scholarship was far broader and is often perceived to transcend the specific question of reconciling the virtue of merchants with contemporary perceptions of merchants.

== Legacy ==
Nakai Riken wrote extensive commentaries on the three of the four books Analects, Doctrine of the mean and Mencius. He rejected other works as unreliable dreams, largely due to their unverifiability. In these works, he dismissed the book of changes, the book on Songs and the book of history as unreliable, and further the book of rites and the spring and autumn annals as unreliable or of authorship different from the received interpretation.

However, his lasting legacy was in reaching a point of contradiction between the demand for verifiability in the Kaitokudo school and the reliance on the reading of text as history.

The influence of Nakai Riken, as well as Nakai Chikuzan and other contemporary moral philosophers outside the mainstream of Neo-confucianism, shingaku and Buddhism can be seen most immediately and concisely in the work of Yamagata Banto. It is said that Chikuzan has ongoing and great influence on his thought, but that Riken was more heavily involved in the final push toward publication of Yamagata’s work yume no shiro .

== List of publications ==
- 『華胥国物語』
- 『四茅議』（恤刑茅議・均田茅議・攘斥茅議・浚河茅議）
- 『通語』
- 『有間星』
- 『遺草合巻』
- 『越俎弄筆』
- 『華胥国新暦』
- 『顕微鏡記』
- 『史記雕題』
- 『中庸錯簡説』
- 『中庸懐徳堂定本』
- 『中庸断』
- 『中庸雕題』
- 『中庸雕題略』
- 『中庸天楽楼定本』
- 『中庸逢原』
- 『詩雕題』
- 『毛詩雕題附言』
- 『論語雕題』
- 『論語雕題略』
- 『論語逢原』
- 『荘子雕題』
- 『孟子雕題』
- 『孟子雕題略』
