= Kaitokudō =

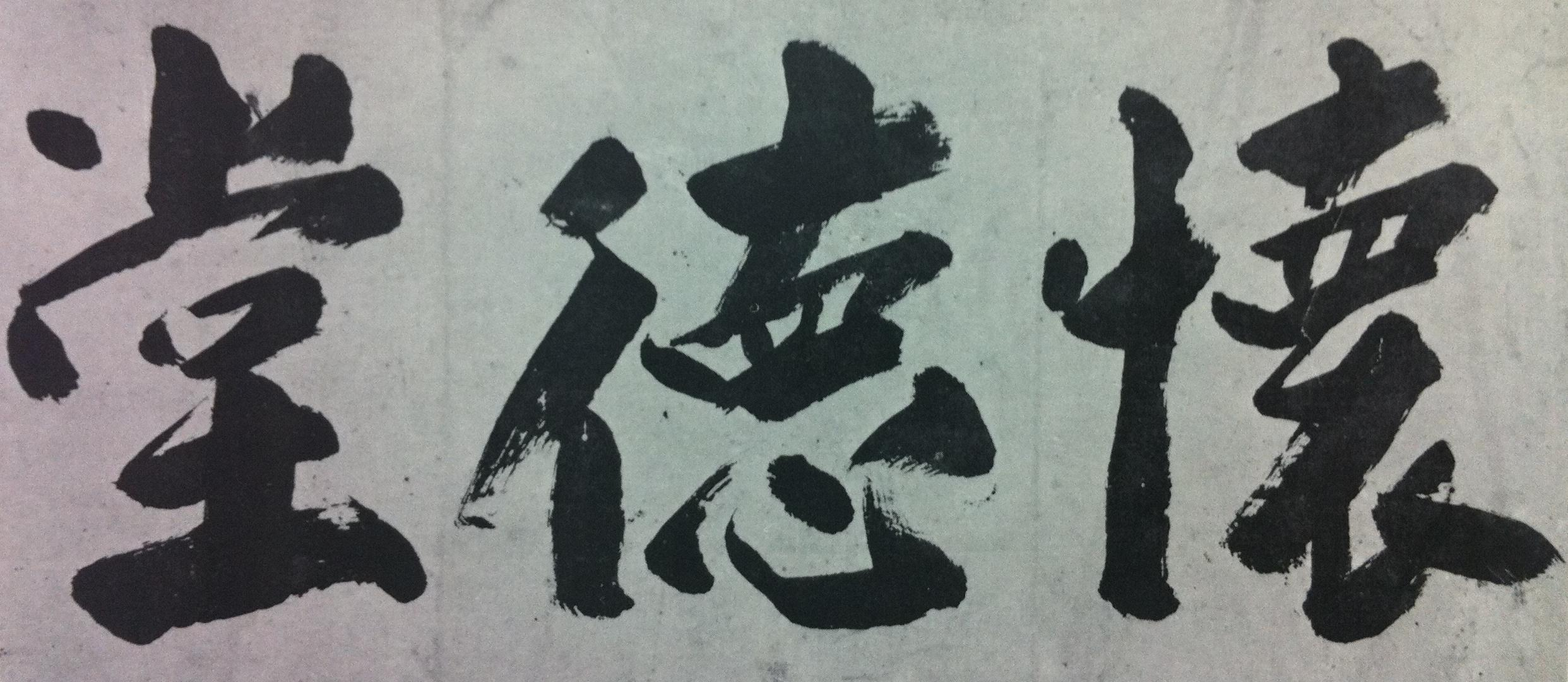
Kaitokudō by Sekian Miyake

The Kaitokudō (Japanese: 懐徳堂) was a merchant academy located in Osaka, Japan, during the Tokugawa period. Although it opened its doors in 1724, it was founded officially in 1726 by Nakai Shūan. It remained a public institution until 1868, although there have been modern revivals.

The Kaitokudō began as a small meeting group of Osaka merchants, Tashōdō, who met to discuss virtue, or moral education, through the reading and study (gakumon) of classic texts. A fire at the Tashōdō in 1724 spurred already developing plans to establish a legal institution in the form of a public academic with a continued focus on the moral education of merchants. This was gained in 1726. Land was granted in perpetuity, provided that the academy be financed by the local merchants. The original finances are attributed to the members of the Tashōdō.

The main remit of the school was on moral education of merchants. Public lectures maintained this focus and classes were regularly scheduled on business, whereas private seminars moved beyond the four books to examine Chinese poetry, native literature, and also science and astronomy based on the expertise and interests of the teacher (jusha). Lines were drawn against teaching unverifiable knowledge, such as that pertaining to shingaku, Buddhism, dreams and other mysticism.

== Significance ==
This school was significant during the Tokugawa period not only for permitting merchants to participate freely in higher education at a time when engagement was rare or discouraged, but focusing almost exclusively on the education of merchants. As a school of thought, its scholars consciously contributed greatly to reconciling merchants and contemporary views of merchants in Tokugawa society; and have been credited with advancing the articulation of contradictions between the demand for verifiability in knowledge and the reliance on the reading of text as history.

Although consciously only extending to the equality of people in their capacity for virtue and learning, the significance of the school lay in its advocacy of acceptance of wider scientific and geographical scholarship, as instanced in the works of Yamagata Bantō, whose radical reorganization of knowledge and admiration for Western scientific methods remained, however, marginalized since they challenged the remit of the school. The Kaitokudō's commitment to the Chinese classics, however, did not allow this marked change to occur within the walls of the academy. Later scholars would regularly cite Yamagata as an influence toward science. Najita marks the academy's decline with reference to the rise of the Tekijuku as a nearby foreign language school of medicine and other (western) sciences which gained in popularity since its inception in 1838.

== Academic headship ==
- Miyake Sekian, 1726–1730 (with Nakai Shuan directing of external affairs)
- Miyake Shunro, 1730–1782 (public lectures conducted by Goi Ranju and Nakai Chikuzan)
- Nakai Chikuzan, 1782–1804 (closely associated with his brother Nakai Riken
- ?Nakai Riken, 1804–1817 (delivered lectures but lived away from the academy with no involvement in administration
- ?Nakai Sekka,

== Modern era ==
The academy was revived in 1910 based on a publication called the Kaitoku, which sponsored lectures and meetings in the spirit of the Kaitokudō from funds contributed by Sumitomo and other commercial Osaka operations. The academy building was also renovated at that time; however it was burned down in the fire bombings of the following Pacific War. The library, much of it in Dutch, has survived, however, and is housed at Osaka University as Kaitokudō Bunkan. With the end of the Tokugawa Bakufu in 1868, the Kaikokudō also closed its gates to further instruction.

== Notable scholars ==
- Miyake Sekian, 1665–1730
- Nakai Shuan, d. 1758
- Goi Ranju, 1697–1762
- Nakai Chikuzan, 1730–1804
- Nakai Riken, 1732–1817
- Yamagata Bantō, 1748–1821

== See also ==
- Osaka University
- Tekijuku
