= Chunshan Song =

Chinese chemical engineer

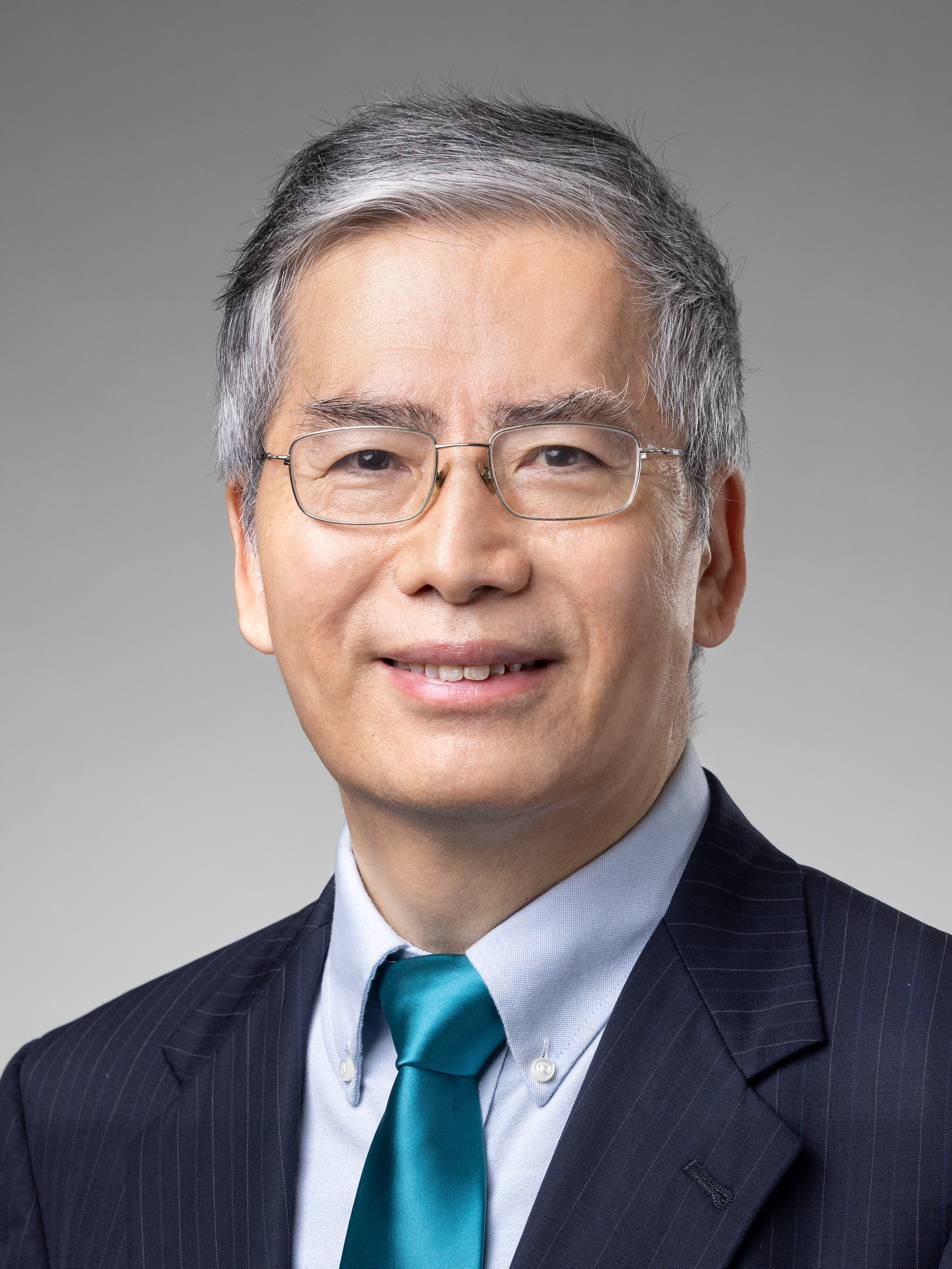
- Song in 2022
- Occupations: Chemical engineer, chemist, energy researcher, energy researcher, and academic

Academic background
- Education: B.S., Chemical Engineering; M.S., Applied Chemistry; Ph.D., Applied Chemistry
- Alma mater: Dalian University of Technology; Osaka University

Academic work
- Institutions: Pennsylvania State University; Chinese University of Hong Kong

Chunshan Song (Chinese: 宋春山) is a chemical engineer, chemist, energy researcher, and academic. He is the Dean of Science and Wei Lun Professor of Chemistry at the Chinese University of Hong Kong (CUHK) and a Distinguished Professor emeritus of Fuel Science and Chemical Engineering at the Pennsylvania State University at University Park.

Song's research specializes in energy chemistry and heterogeneous catalysis, wherein he has focused on CO₂ capture and utilization (CCU) for the development of sustainable supply chains of chemicals and fuels. He is a recipient of the 2019 George A. Olah Award in Hydrocarbon or Petroleum Chemistry and the 2010 Henry H. Storch Award in Fuel Chemistry from the American Chemical Society. He is a fellow of the American Chemical Society and a distinguished fellow of the International Association for Carbon Capture. He was elected as a fellow of the Hong Kong Academy of Engineering in 2025, and was also named as a 2025 Pioneer in Energy Research in the field of carbon capture, utilization, and storage (CCUS) by the American Chemical Society's journal Energy and Fuels.

== Education ==
Song was born in the Qiaodong district of Shijiazhuang, Hebei. He completed his Bachelor's in Chemical Engineering at the Dalian University of Technology in 1982. Afterwards, he studied at Osaka University where he received a Master's and a Ph.D. in Applied Chemistry in 1986 and 1989, respectively.

== Career ==
Song was a research associate, then as an assistant professor, and associate professor of Fuel Science at the Pennsylvania State University from 1998 to 2003. He became professor of Fuel Science with his tenure beginning in 2003 and was also appointed professor of Chemical Engineering in 2008. In 2010, he was named Distinguished Professor of Fuel Science, and since 2020, he has held the title of Distinguished Professor emeritus of Fuel Science at the Pennsylvania State University. He moved to Hong Kong in 2020, where he has been the Dean of Science and Wei Lun Professor of Chemistry in the Faculty of Science at the Chinese University of Hong Kong.

Between 2011 and 2020, Song was the founding director of the International Joint Center for Energy Research (JCER) between the Pennsylvania State University and the Dalian University of Technology (DUT), and from 2015 to 2020, he was the founding director of the University Coalition for Fossil Energy Research (UCFER) funded by the United States Department of Energy-National Energy Technology Laboratory (DOE-NETL).

Song is the founding director of the Joint Institute of Advanced Materials and Green Energy Research (JIAMGER), established in November 2024 between CUHK and the Great Bay University.

== Research ==
Song's research spans energy chemistry, heterogeneous catalysis, carbon dioxide (CO₂) capture and utilization, energy and fuels, shape-selective catalysis, synthesis and application of nano-porous materials as catalysts and adsorbents, and different areas of chemical engineering for energy conversion and fuel processing. He developed and published a framework in 1995 for the use of carbon dioxide (CO₂) to develop a sustainable supply of chemicals and fuels. In 2025, he was named a Pioneer in Energy Research (PIER) by Energy and Fuels in the field of carbon capture, utilization, and storage (CCUS), with a special issue of the journal published in his honor in December 2025.

Song and his colleagues pioneered a tri-reforming process that combines CO₂ reforming, steam reforming, and partial oxidation of methane to produce industrially useful syngas with desired H₂/CO ratios and without carbon deposition. He has also investigated nickel-based systems and demonstrated that supported nickel catalysts can promote dry reforming, steam reforming, and partial oxidation of methane within a single reactor. His work has shown that methane-CO₂ reactions could directly help convert CO₂ present in flue gas streams.

In the field of CO₂ capture and utilization, Song developed a class of supported amine sorbents in 2002 by physically loading monomeric or polymeric amines onto porous supports, and subsequently developed "molecular basket" sorbents in which the amine polymer polyethyleneimine (PEI) was immobilized onto porous materials for CO₂ capture. He contributed to early work on solid amine-sorbents by demonstrating the effectiveness of molecular basket sorbents such as those based on polyethylenimine. His studies on flue-gas systems found that optimal CO₂ uptake could occur at relatively higher temperatures.

Song developed successive generations of modified zeolites for producing alkylated naphthalene monomers from petroleum-derived feedstocks, including light cycle oil. His research on the ring-shift isomerization of phenanthrene derivatives into anthracene derivatives provided an understanding of the catalytic processing of complex polyaromatic hydrocarbons. His work in shape-selective catalysis also includes his book, Shape-Selective Catalysis: Chemical Synthesis and Hydrocarbon Processing, published by the American Chemical Society in 2000.

Song's research on energy and fuels has addressed challenges in producing cleaner fuels, particularly the need for novel and improved desulfurization technologies.He received the George Olah Award of the American Chemical Society in 2019 for his contributions to hydrocarbon and petroleum chemistry. He has evaluated and applied crystalline mesoporous materials such as MCM-41 for petroleum processing.

Song and his collaborators have also researched materials synthesis and chemical engineering, wherein they have synthesized metal organic frameworks such as MIL-53-NH₂ through solvothermal methods, studied how solvent ratios affect particle morphology, explored hydrofluoric acid as a modulator for zirconium-based MOFs, and engineered silicate-1 nanotubes up to 600 nm in length.

== Awards and honors ==
- 2004 – Fulbright Distinguished Scholar, US-UK State Department
- 2007 – Herman Pines Award, Catalysis Club of Chicago
- 2010 – Fellow, American Chemical Society
- 2010 – Henry H. Storch Award, American Chemical Society
- 2011 – Excellence in Catalysis Award, Catalysis Club of Philadelphia
- 2011 – Distinguished Researcher Award, American Chemical Society
- 2017 – Global Alumni Fellow, Osaka University
- 2019 – George A. Olah Award in Hydrocarbon or Petroleum Chemistry, American Chemical Society
- 2022 – Outstanding Achievement Award, Chinese American Chemical Society
- 2024 – Distinguished Fellow, International Association for Carbon Capture
- 2024 - Fellow, Royal Society of Chemistry
- 2025 – Michele Aresta Prize, 22nd International Conference on Carbon Dioxide Utilization (ICCDU)
- 2025 – Carbon Capture Outstanding Achievement Award, 4th International Conference on Carbon Capture Science and Technology
- 2025 – Fellow, Hong Kong Academy of Engineering
- 2025 – Pioneer in Energy Research, Energy and Fuels

== Bibliography ==
=== Selected books ===
- Song, Chunshan; Garcés, Juan M. (2000). Shape-Selective Catalysis: Chemicals Synthesis and Hydrocarbon Processing. American Chemical Society; Distributed by Oxford University Press. ISBN 978-0-8412-3619-6.
- Song, Chunshan; Hsu, Chang S.; Mochida, Isao (2000). Chemistry of Diesel Fuels. Taylor & Francis. ISBN 978-1-003-07545-5.
- Song, Chunshan; Gaffney, Anne F.; Fujimoto, Kaoru (2002). CO₂ Conversion and Utilization. American Chemical Society. ISBN 978-0-8412-3747-6.
- Maroto-Valer, Mercedes M.; Song, Chunshan; Soong, Yee (2002). Environmental Challenges and Greenhouse Gas Control for Fossil Fuel Utilization in the 21st Century. Kluwer Academic/Plenum Publishers. ISBN 978-1-4615-0773-4.
- Song, Chunshan; Schobert, Harold H; Andresen, John M (2005). Premium Carbon Products and Organic Chemicals from Coal. IEA Coal Research, Clean Coal Centre, London. ISBN 978-92-9029-413-9.
- Liu, Ke; Song, Chunshan; Subramani, Velu (2010). Hydrogen and Syngas Production and Purification Technologies. Wiley. ISBN 978-0-471-71975-5.

=== Selected articles ===
- Song, Chunshan (1995). "Towards Efficient Coal Utilization in the 21st Century". Journal of Japan Society of Energy and Resources. 16 (1): 63–64.
- Song, Chunshan (2006). "Global challenges and strategies for control, conversion and utilization of CO2 for sustainable development involving energy, catalysis, adsorption and chemical processing". Catalysis Today. 115 (1–4): 2–32. doi:10.1016/j.cattod.2006.02.029.
- Ma, Xiaoliang; Wang, Xiaoxing; Song, Chunshan (2009). "Molecular Basket Sorbents for Separation of CO₂ and H₂S from Various Gas Streams". Journal of the American Chemical Society. 131 (16): 5777–5783. doi:10.1021/ja8074105.H
- Dai, Chengyi; Zhang, Anfeng; Liu, Min; Guo, Xinwen; Song, Chunshan (2015). "Hollow ZSM‐5 with Silicon‐Rich Surface, Double Shells, and Functionalized Interior with Metallic Nanoparticles and Carbon Nanotubes". Advanced Functional Materials. 25 (48): 7479–7487. doi:10.1002/adfm.201502980.
- AlQahtani, Mohammad S.; Wang, Xiaoxing; Knecht, Sean D.; Bilén, Sven G.; Song, Chunshan (2021). "Plasma-enhanced catalytic reduction of SO₂: Decoupling plasma-induced surface reaction from plasma-phase reaction". Applied Catalysis B: Environmental. 286 119852. doi:10.1016/j.apcatb.2020.119852.
- Wang, Xiaoxing; Song, Chunshan (2023). "Developing High-Capacity Solid "Molecular Basket" Sorbents for Selective CO₂ Capture and Separation". Accounts of Chemical Research. 56 (23): 3358–3368. doi:10.1021/acs.accounts.3c00444.
- He, Xiaoyu; Ding, Yujia; Huang, Zhennan; Liu, Min; Chi, Miaofang; Wu, Zili; Segre, Carlo U.; Song, Chunshan; Wang, Xiang; Guo, Xinwen (2023). "Engineering a Self‐Grown TiO₂/Ti‐MOF Heterojunction with Selectively Anchored High‐Density Pt Single‐Atomic Cocatalysts for Efficient Visible‐Light‐Driven Hydrogen Evolution". Angewandte Chemie International Edition. 62 (25). doi:10.1002/anie.202217439.
- Wang, Li; Wang, Haiyan; Huang, Helong; Yun, Tianqi; Song, Chunshan; Shi, Chuan (2024). "Transition Metal Carbides: Emerging CO₂ Hydrogenation Catalysts, from Recent Advance to Future Exploration". Advanced Functional Materials. 34 (7). doi:10.1002/adfm.202309850.
- Wang, Mingrui; Zhang, Guanghui; Wang, Hao; Wang, Zhiqun; Zhou, Yu; Nie, Xiaowa; Yin, Ben Hang; Song, Chunshan; Guo, Xinwen (2024). "Understanding and Tuning the Effects of H₂O on Catalytic CO and CO₂ Hydrogenation". Chemical Reviews. 124 (21): 12006–12085. doi:10.1021/acs.chemrev.4c00282.
- Ye, Pengxian; Miao, Guang; Ray, Debjyoti; Tang, Zihui; Song, Chunshan (2025). "Plasma-Driven Catalytic Conversion of Biogas to Methanol and Acetic Acid and the Role of Water in Tailoring Products". ACS Sustainable Chemistry & Engineering. 13 (20): 7532–7540. doi:10.1021/acssuschemeng.5c01293.
- Wang, Mingrui; Guo, Shendong; Yan, Siyang; Wang, Zhiqun; Zhang, Guanghui; Gao, Hui; Zhang, Miao; Bian, Kai; Liu, Jiaxu; Nie, Xiaowa; Zeng, Jianrong; Song, Chunshan; Guo, Xinwen (2025). "Engineering the Cu(0)–Co₂C Interface via Reaction-Induced Reconstruction for CO₂ Hydrogenation to C₂+ Hydrocarbons". Journal of the American Chemical Society. 147 (45): 42051–42060. doi:10.1021/jacs.5c15658.
