= University of Osaka =

Public university in Osaka, Japan

Coordinates: 34°49′09″N 135°31′36″E

The University of Osaka
- 大阪大学
- Motto: 地域に生き世界に伸びる
- Motto in English: Live Locally, Grow Globally
- Type: Public (National)
- Established: Kaitokudo founded 1724; Osaka Imperial University established 1931
- Budget: 186.718 billion yen (2023)
- President: Shojiro Nishio
- Faculty: 3,357
- Administrative staff: 3,672
- Students: 23,226
- Undergraduates: 15,075
- Postgraduates: 8,151
- Doctoral students: 3,374
- Other students: 537 (research students and auditors)
- Location: Toyonaka/Suita/Minoh/Osaka, Osaka Prefecture, Japan
- Campus: Suburban, 1.58 km²
- Authorized Student Groups: 59 sports-related, 70 culture-related
- Colors: Sky blue
- Mascot: Dr. Wani
- Website: osaka-u.ac.jp

The University of Osaka (大阪大学, Ōsaka daigaku), abbreviated as UOsaka or Handai (阪大), is a national research university in Osaka Prefecture, Japan. The university traces its roots back to Edo-era institutions Tekijuku (1838) and Kaitokudo (1724), and was officially established in 1931 as the sixth of the Imperial Universities in Japan with two faculties: science and medicine. Following the post-war educational reform, it merged with three pre-war higher schools, reconstructed into a national reseaerch university with five faculties: science, medicine, letters, law and economics, and engineering. After the merger with Osaka University of Foreign Studies in 2007, UOsaka became the largest national university in Japan by undergraduate enrollment. The official name of the university in English has been changed from "Osaka University" to "The University of Osaka (UOsaka)" as of April 2025.

UOsaka is one of the most productive research institutions in Japan. Numerous prominent scholars and scientists have attended or worked at UOsaka, such as Nobel Laureate in Physics Hideki Yukawa, Nobel Laureate in Medicine Shimon Sakaguchi, manga artist Osamu Tezuka, Lasker Award winner Hidesaburō Hanafusa, and author Ryōtarō Shiba.

== History ==
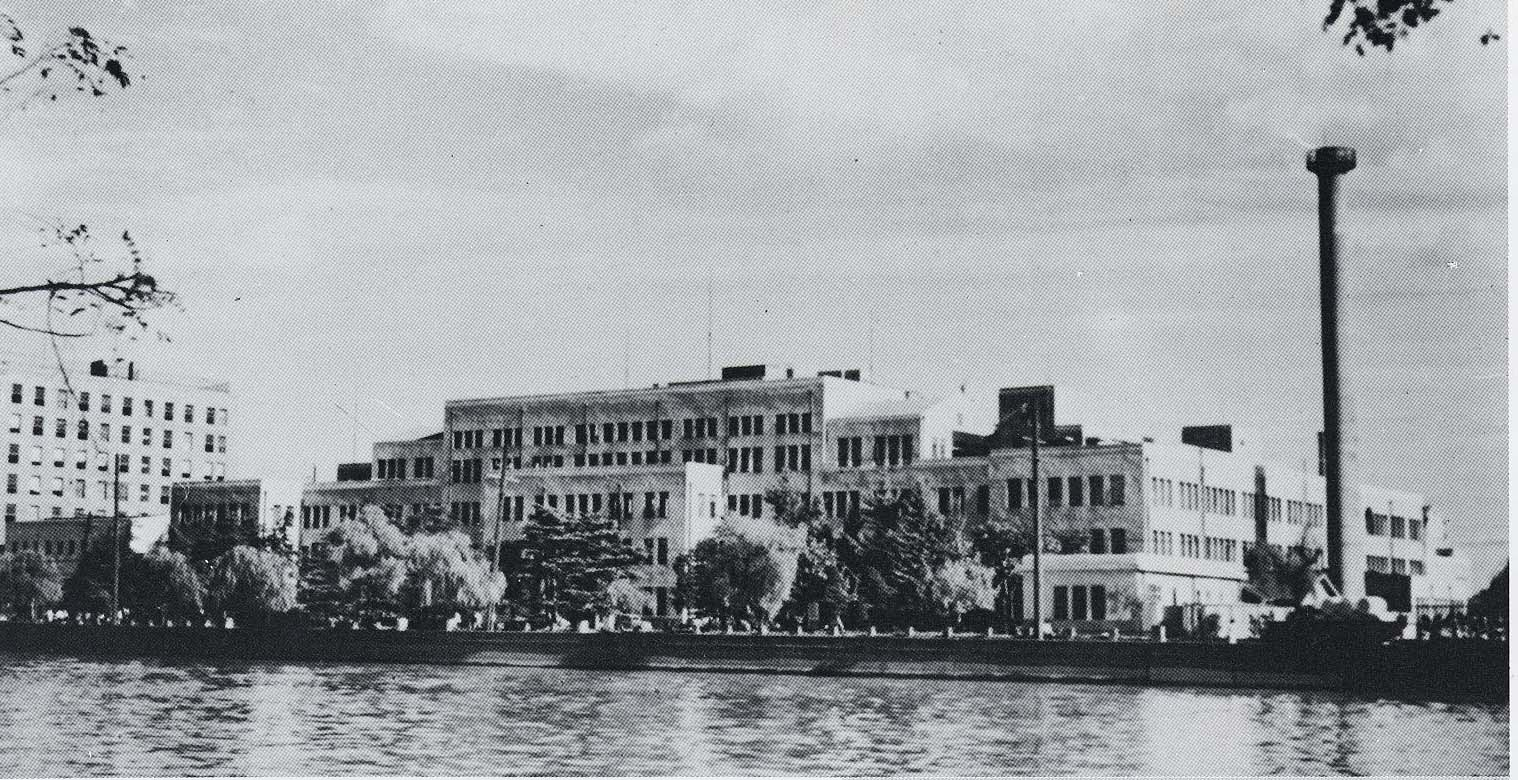
Osaka Imperial University Nakanoshima Campus

The academic traditions of the University of Osaka trace back to the Kaitokudō (懐徳堂), an Edo-period school for local citizens founded in 1724, and the Tekijuku (適塾), a school of Rangaku for samurai founded by Ogata Kōan in 1838. The spirit of the university's humanities programmes is believed to be intimately rooted in the history of the Kaitokudō, whereas that of the natural and applied sciences is founded upon the traditions of the Tekijuku. The modern origin of UOsaka began as Osaka Prefectural Medical School founded in downtown Osaka City in 1869. The school was later designated with university status by the University Ordinance (Imperial Ordinance No. 388) as the Osaka Prefectural Medical College in 1919. The Medical College merged with the newly founded College of Science to form Osaka Imperial University in 1931. Osaka Imperial University was the sixth imperial university in Japan. Osaka Technical College was incorporated to form the School of Engineering two years later. The entire university was renamed Osaka University in 1947.

After its merger with National Osaka Higher School and Prefectural Naniwa Higher School directed through the post-war educational system reform by the Japanese government in 1949, UOsaka was relaunched with five faculties: Science, Medicine, Engineering, Letters, and Law. Since then new faculties and research institutes have been established, including the School of Human Sciences, first of its kind in Japan.

In 1993, Osaka University Hospital (currently the University of Osaka Hospital) was relocated from the Nakanoshima Campus in downtown Osaka, consolidating its campuses into the Suita and Toyonaka areas. In October 2007, a merger between UOsaka and the Osaka University of Foreign Studies in Minoh was completed. The merger made UOsaka one of two national universities in the country with a School of Foreign Studies, along with the Tokyo University of Foreign Studies.

== Campuses ==
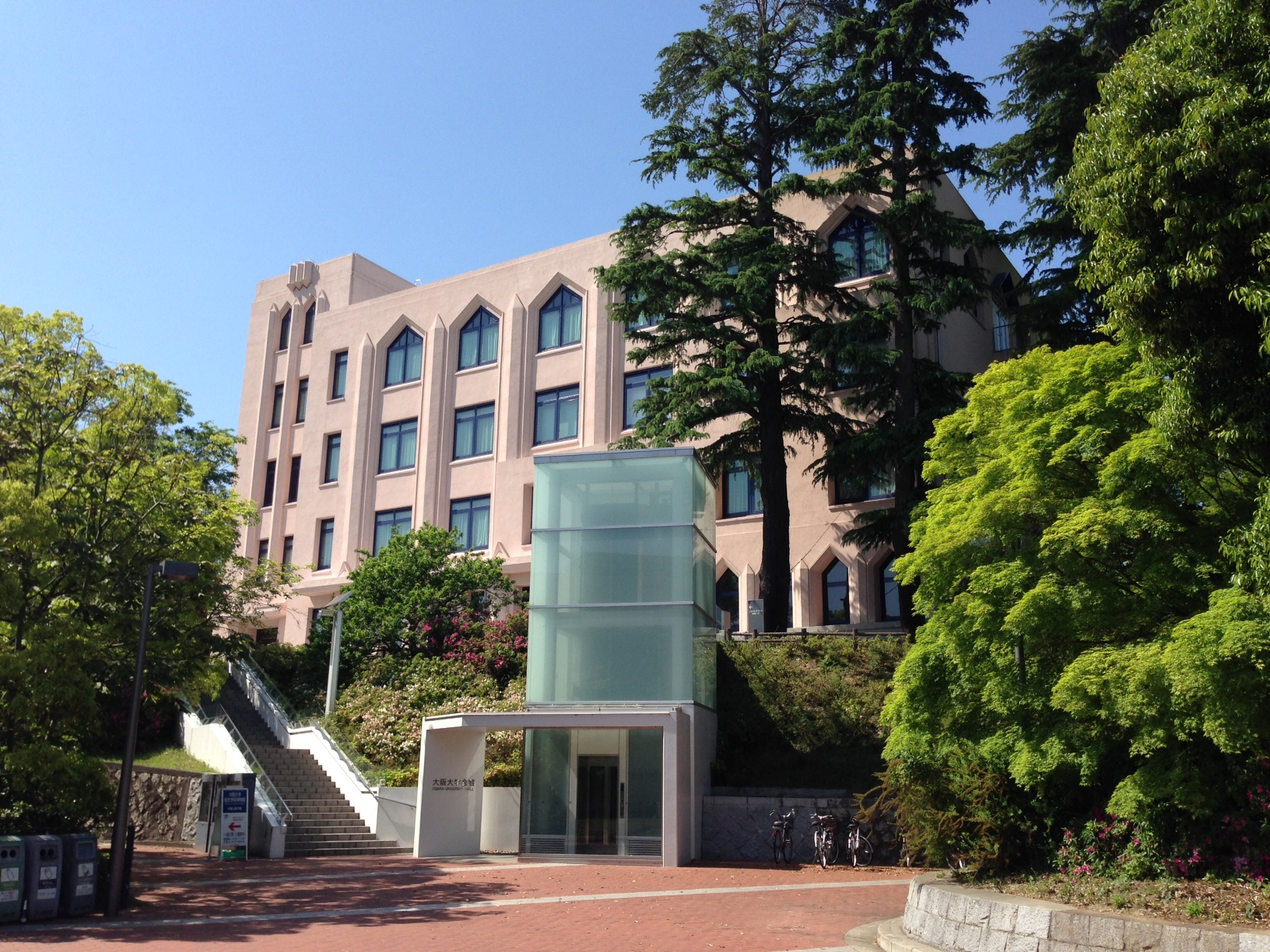
Osaka University Hall

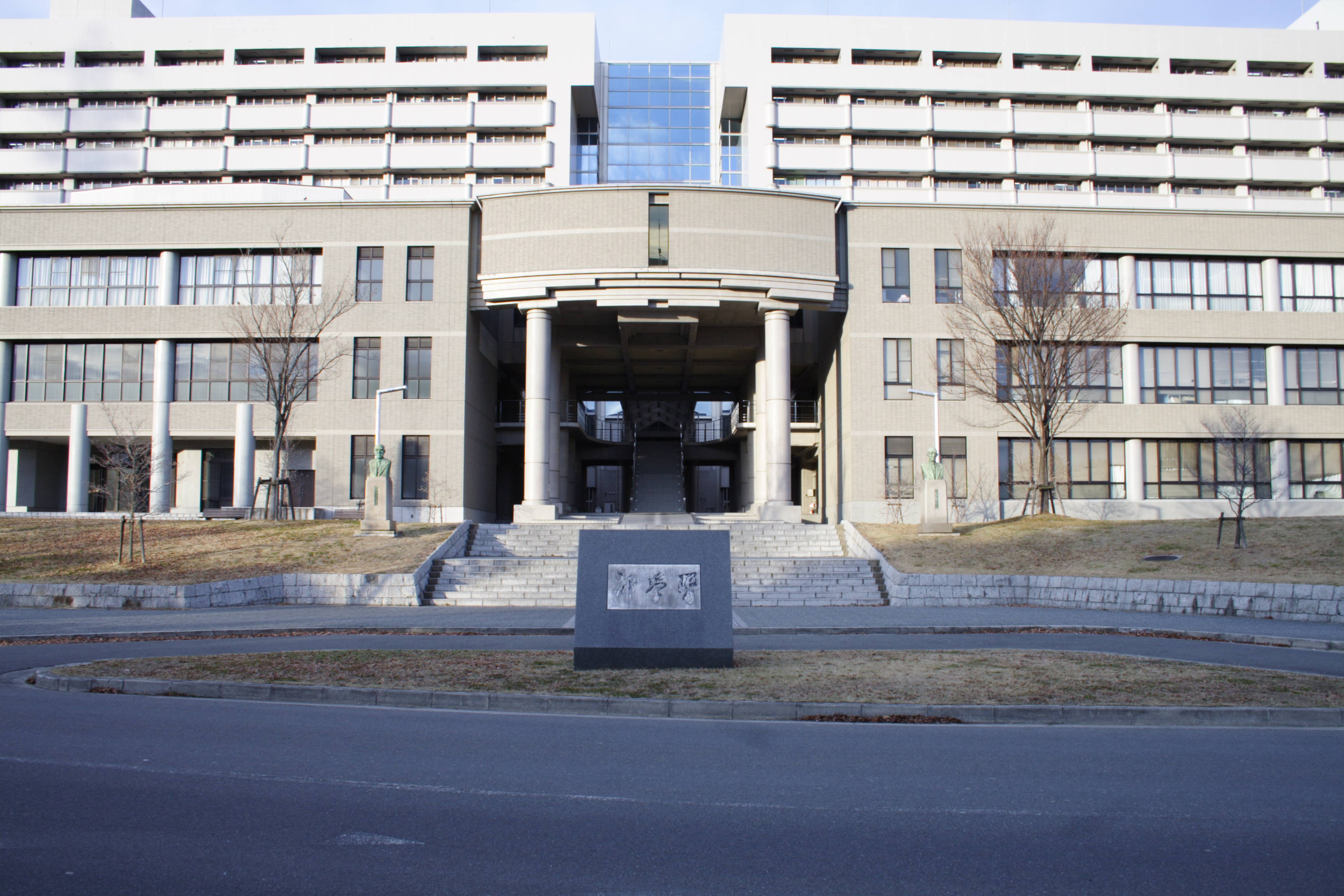
Medical Building

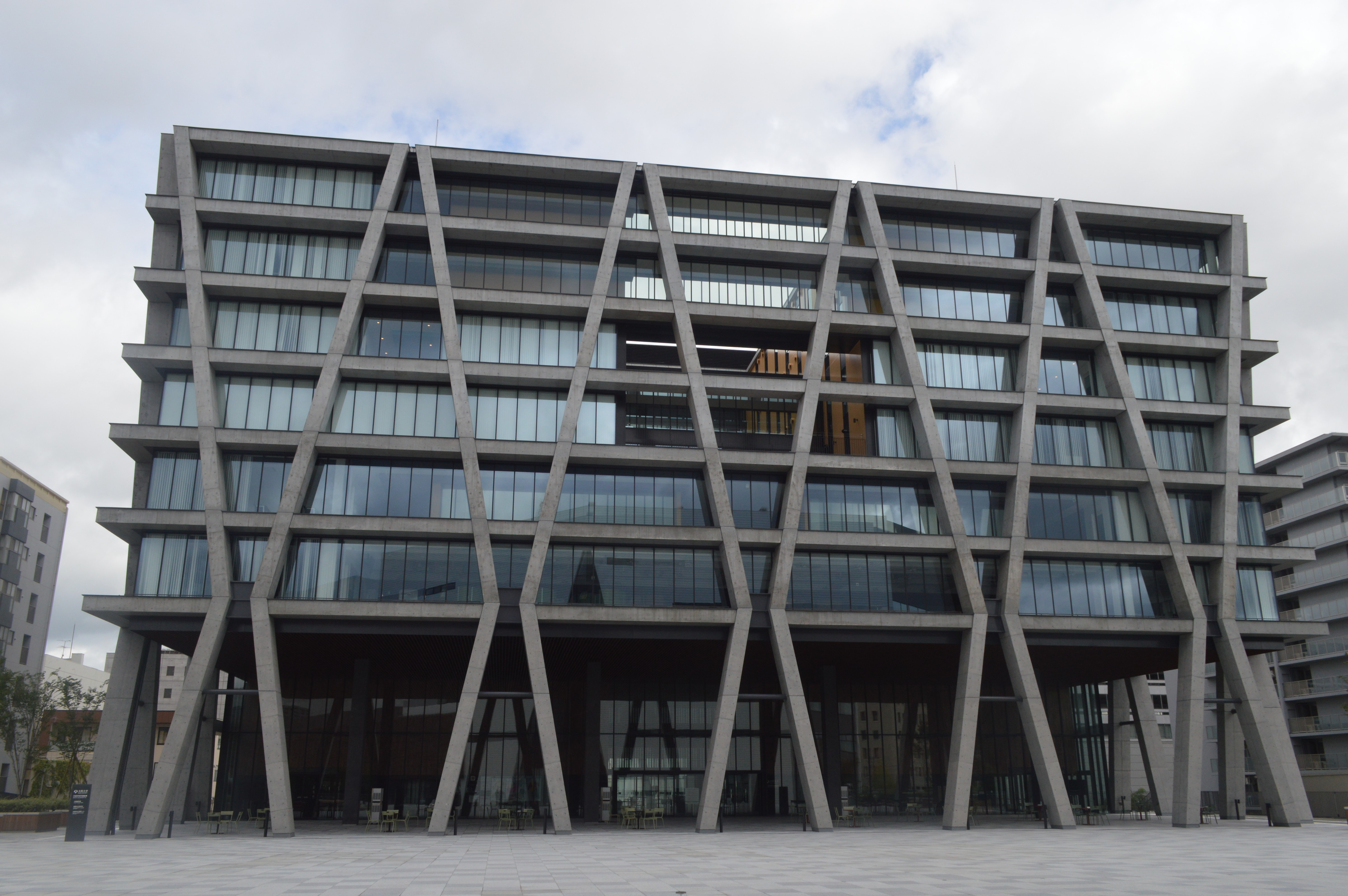
Minoh Campus

=== Toyonaka Campus ===
The Toyonaka Campus is home to faculties of Humanities, Law, Economics, Science, and Engineering Science. It is also the academic base for Graduate Schools of International Public Policy, Language and Culture, a portion of Information Science, and the Center for the Practice of Legal and Political Expertise. All undergraduates attend classes on the Toyonaka Campus during their first year of enrollment. Sports activities are primarily concentrated on the Toyonaka Campus, with the exception of tennis, which is located in Suita.

=== Suita Campus ===
The Suita Campus houses faculties of Human Sciences, Medicine, Dentistry, Pharmaceutical Sciences, and Engineering. It contains the Graduate School of Frontier Biosciences and a portion of the Graduate School of Information Science and Technology. The campus is also home to the University of Osaka Hospital and the Nationwide Joint Institute of Cybermedia Center and Research Center for Nuclear Physics.

=== Minoh Campus ===
The Minoh Campus was incorporated following the merger with the Osaka University of Foreign Studies in October 2007. Its location was moved recently. The Minoh Campus is home to the School of Foreign Studies, the Research Institute for World Languages, and the Center for Japanese Language and Culture.

=== Nakanoshima Campus ===
In addition to these three campuses, the former Nakanoshima Campus, the university's earliest campus located in downtown Osaka, served as the hub for the faculty of medicine until the transfer to the Suita Campus was completed in 1993. In April 2004, the Nakanoshima Campus became the university's Nakanoshima Center, serving as a venue for information exchange, adult education classes, and activities involving academic as well as non-academic communities.

== Organization ==
The University of Osaka consists of 11 undergraduate schools and 15 graduate schools. The undergraduate schools include Letters, Human Sciences, Foreign Studies, Law, Economics, Science, (Faculty of) Medicine, Dentistry, Pharmaceutical Sciences, Engineering, and Engineering Science. At postgraduate level, the schools cover a range of disciplines: Humanities, Human Sciences, Law and Politics, Economics, Science, Medicine, Dentistry, Pharmaceutical Sciences, Engineering, Engineering Science, International Public Policy, Information Science and Technology, Frontier Biosciences, Law (Law School), and the United School of Child Development, which is a collaboration with Kanazawa University, Hamamatsu University School of Medicine, Chiba University, and the University of Fukui.

UOsaka also has 21 research institutes, 4 libraries, and 2 university hospitals.

Some staff at UOsaka are represented by the General Union, a member of the National Union of General Workers, which is itself a member of the National Trade Union Council.

UOsaka maintains four overseas Centers for Education and Research, in San Francisco, Groningen, Bangkok, and Shanghai.

=== English-medium programs ===
The University of Osaka's School of Human Sciences on the Suita Campus hosts an English-medium four-year undergraduate degree program. The program started in 2011 as a result of the national government's G30 (Global 30) Project. Although the government ended the G30 Project in 2014 and replaced it with the Top Global University Project, the Human Sciences International Undergraduate Program continues. Areas of study include sociology, anthropology, philosophy, education, behavioral sciences, psychology, human development, and area studies. Focus is on the development of an interdisciplinary, international, and problem-solving orientation to research and education. The degree programme is based on international benchmarking standards, has competitive entry requirements and attracts students from all over the world.

UOsaka's Graduate School of Humanities hosts another English-medium program in Global Japanese Studies for graduate students, one of the Graduate Programs for Advanced Interdisciplinary Studies.

=== Academic alliances ===
The University of Osaka holds international academic exchange agreements with a large number of universities and research institutes from around the world. These academic exchange agreements foster opportunities for joint research and student exchange activities taking place between UOsaka and these universities and schools. As of May 1, 2024, 156 inter-university agreements and 651 inter-faculty agreements are being managed.

UOsaka's academic alliances include Cornell University (1989), Harvard University (2008), Stanford University (2008), and the California Institute of Technology (2008) in the United States, McGill University (1996), the University of Toronto (1999) and the University of British Columbia (2019) in Canada, Seoul National University (2000) and Yonsei University (1998) in South Korea, Peking University (2001) and Tsinghua University (2004) in China, the National University of Singapore (2008), the National Taiwan University (2008), the University of Hong Kong, and Australian National University (1995). In Europe, alliances include the University of Groningen (2002), the University of Bologna (2006), the University of Geneva (2007), and the University of Cologne (1982). Allied institutions in the United Kingdom include the University of Oxford (1997) and the Imperial College London (2006).

== Academic rankings ==
University rankings
Global
THE	General	=147
QS	General	95
ARWU	Research	101–150

Regional
THE Asia (Asia version)	General	29
QS Asia (Asia version)	General	23
ARWU Asia	Research	30

=== General ===
The University of Osaka is recognised as a top-tier national research university, with its reputation evident in constant high rankings both domestically and internationally.

In the 2027 QS World University Rankings by Quacquarelli Symonds, UOsaka was placed 95th globally, 23rd in Asia, and 3rd in Japan after UTokyo and KyotoU.

In the 2027 Times Higher Education World University Rankings, it was ranked 147th globally, 29th in Asia, and 4th in Japan.

According to Thomson Reuters, it is ranked 22nd for innovation worldwide and 2nd in Japan.

=== Subjects ===
Its notable research achievements include leading positions in immunology (first in Japan, fourth globally), material science (fourth in Japan, fifteenth globally), and chemistry (fifth in Japan, fourteenth globally). It also ranks seventh for research funding per researcher in the Japanese COE Programme and third in Japan for the number of patents accepted in 2017.

In the Nature index 2024 annual table, UOsaka was ranked 34th globally for its output in selected journals in the fields of natural sciences and Health Sciences research, among all leading research institutions in the world (3rd in Japan).

QS World University Rankings by Subject 2024
Subject	Global	National
Arts & Humanities	▲ =195	5
Linguistics	101–150	4–5
Architecture and Built Environment	151–200	▲5–7
Classics and Ancient History	51–100	3–7
English Language and Literature	201–250	▼5
History	101–150	▼4–6
Modern Languages	▲ =76	4
Philosophy	151–200	3
Engineering and Technology	▲ =109	5
Engineering – Chemical	101–150	4–7
Computer Science and Information Systems	▲ =146	4
Engineering – Electrical and Electronic	▲134	5
Engineering – Mechanical	▲142	5
Life Sciences & Medicine	▲ =113	3
Biological Sciences	▲84	3
Dentistry	51–100	2–4
Medicine	▲ =112	3
Pharmacy and Pharmacology	151–200	3–6
Psychology	251–300	▼4
Natural Sciences	▼ =93	▲4
Chemistry	▲58	4
Environmental Sciences	301–350	8–9
Materials Sciences	87	5
Mathematics	151–200	4–7
Physics and Astronomy	▲ =45	▲4
Social Sciences & Management	▼ =199	6
Accounting and Finance	151–200	▲3–6
Business and Management Studies	▼351–400	▼8
Economics and Econometrics	▲119	▲4
Education and Training	▲251–300	▲3
Law and Legal Studies	▼201–250	▼7–8
Politics	201–250	5–6
Sociology	▲101–150	▲3–4
Statistics and Operational Research	151–200	▼4

THE World University Rankings by Subject 2024
Subject	Global	National
Arts & humanities	401–500	▼8–9
Business & economics	251–300	3
Clinical & health	▲80	3
Computer science	▲126–150	▲4–5
Engineering	▲126–150	▲5–6
Life sciences	▲ =68	3
Physical sciences	▲176–200	6
Psychology	▲301–400	▲4–6
Social sciences	▲301–400	▲5–9

ARWU Global Ranking of Academic Subjects 2023
Subject	Global	National
Natural Sciences
Mathematics	▼201–300	3–5
Physics	▲151–200	▲4–5
Chemistry	▼101–150	▼5–6
Engineering
Mechanical Engineering	201–300	4
Electrical & Electronic Engineering	201–300	▼2–3
Biomedical Engineering	▼201–300	3–4
Materials Science & Engineering	▼201–300	▼6–8
Nanoscience & Nanotechnology	▼301–400	▼5–8
Biotechnology	▼301–400	▼5–6
Metallurgical Engineering	51–75	▼3–4
Life Sciences
Biological Sciences	151–200	▼5
Human Biological Sciences	▼201–300	▼4–5
Medical Sciences
Clinical Medicine	401–500	▲4–7
Public Health	301–400	2–4
Dentistry & Oral Sciences	21	1
Medical Technology	▼301–400	1–6
Social Sciences
Political Sciences	301–400	3

=== Selectivity ===
The University of Osaka is one of the most selective universities in Japan. In most Japanese university selectivity tables, UOsaka comes after the top two universities, the University of Tokyo and Kyoto University.

== Athletics ==
The University of Osaka and Nagoya University hold regular Athletics Competition every year. Recent years Osaka also has a regular windsurfing competition relationship with Kyoto University, Kobe University, and Taiwan's National Sun Yat-sen University.

== Notable people ==
=== Nobel laureates ===
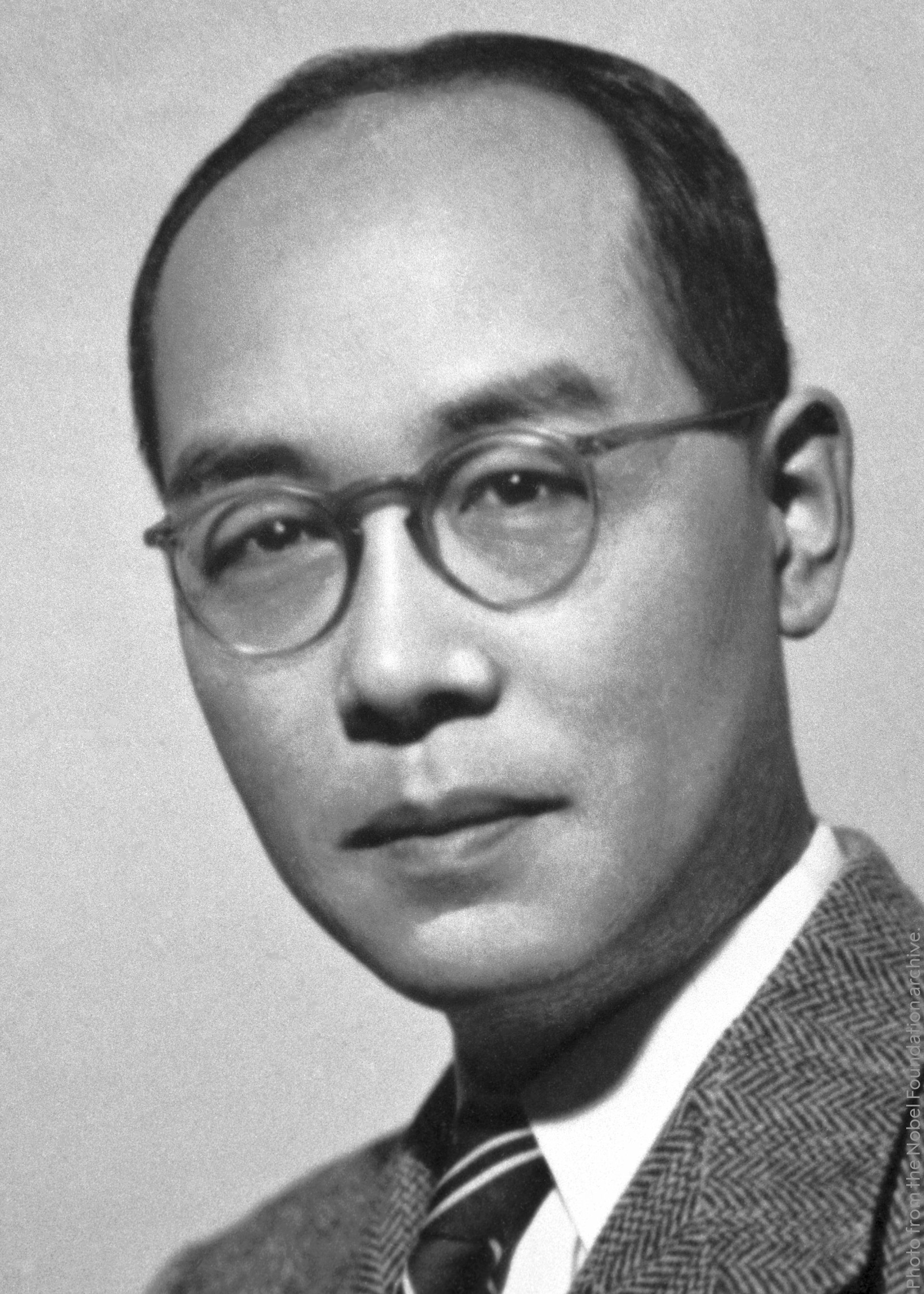
Hideki Yukawa, recipient of the 1949 Nobel Prize in Physics

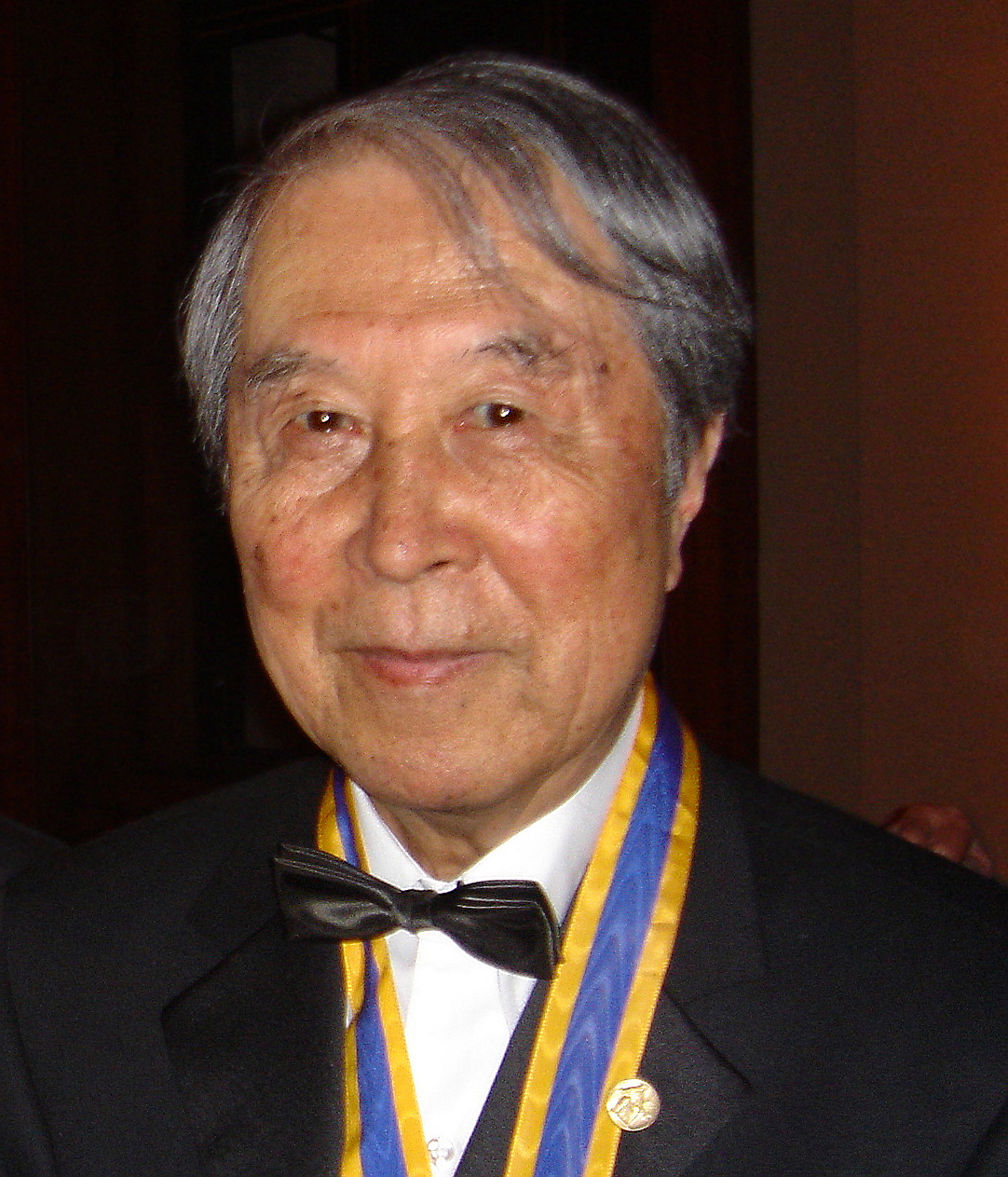
Yoichiro Nambu, recipient of the 2008 Nobel Prize in Physics

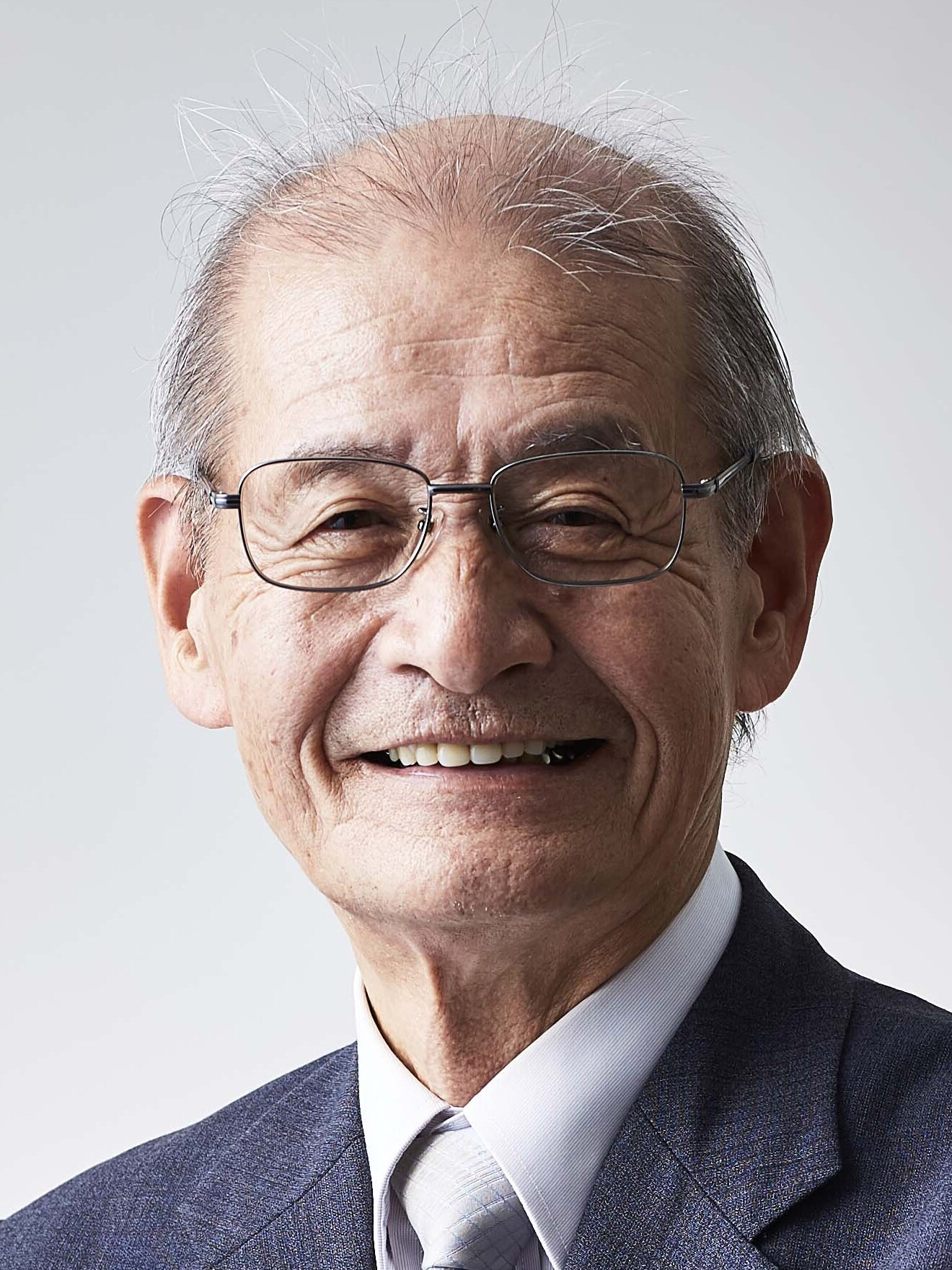
Akira Yoshino, recipient of the 2019 Nobel Prize in Chemistry

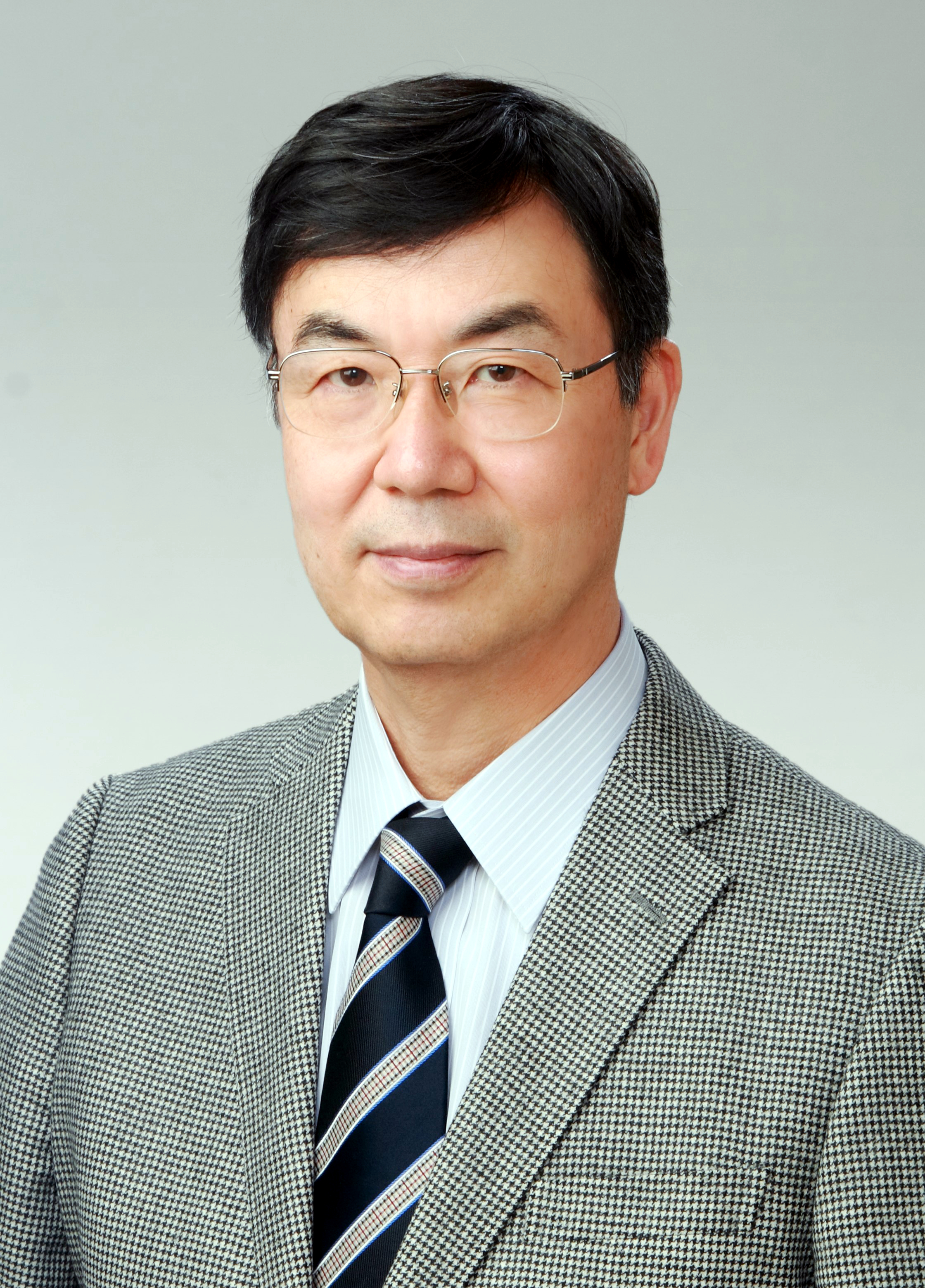
Shimon Sakaguchi, recipient of the 2025 Nobel Prize in Physiology or Medicine

=== Sciences ===
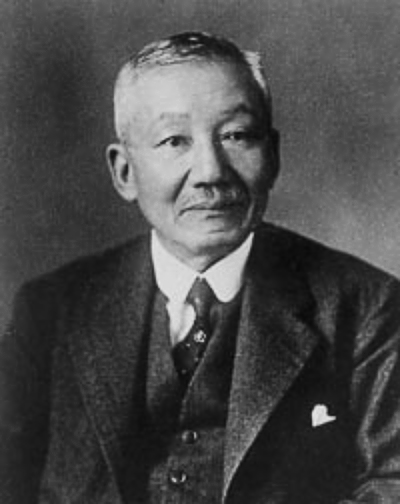
Hantaro Nagaoka, 1st President of OU, pioneer of Japanese physics

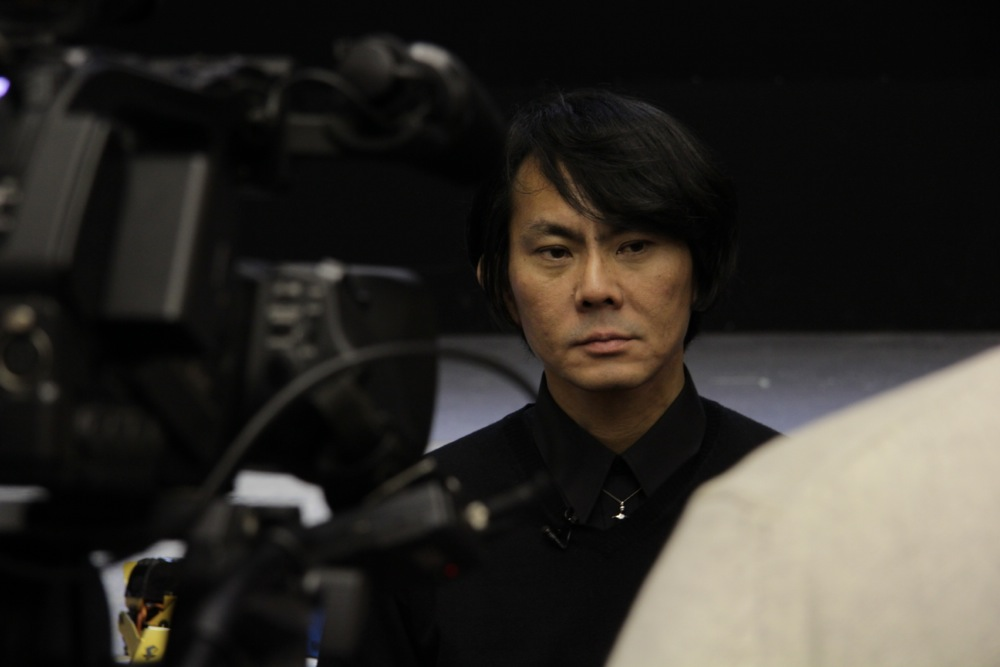
Hiroshi Ishiguro, creator of Geminoid robots

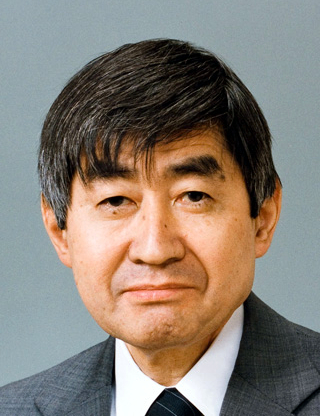
Hidesaburo Hanafusa, virologist, 1982 Albert Lasker Award for Basic Medical Research winner

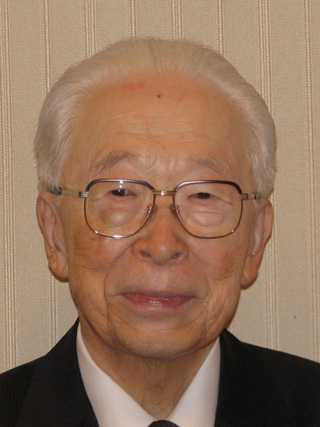
Osamu Hayaishi, 1986 Wolf Prize in Medicine winner

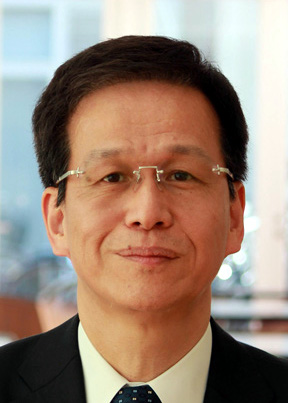
Shizuo Akira, immunologists, 2011 Gairdner Award winner

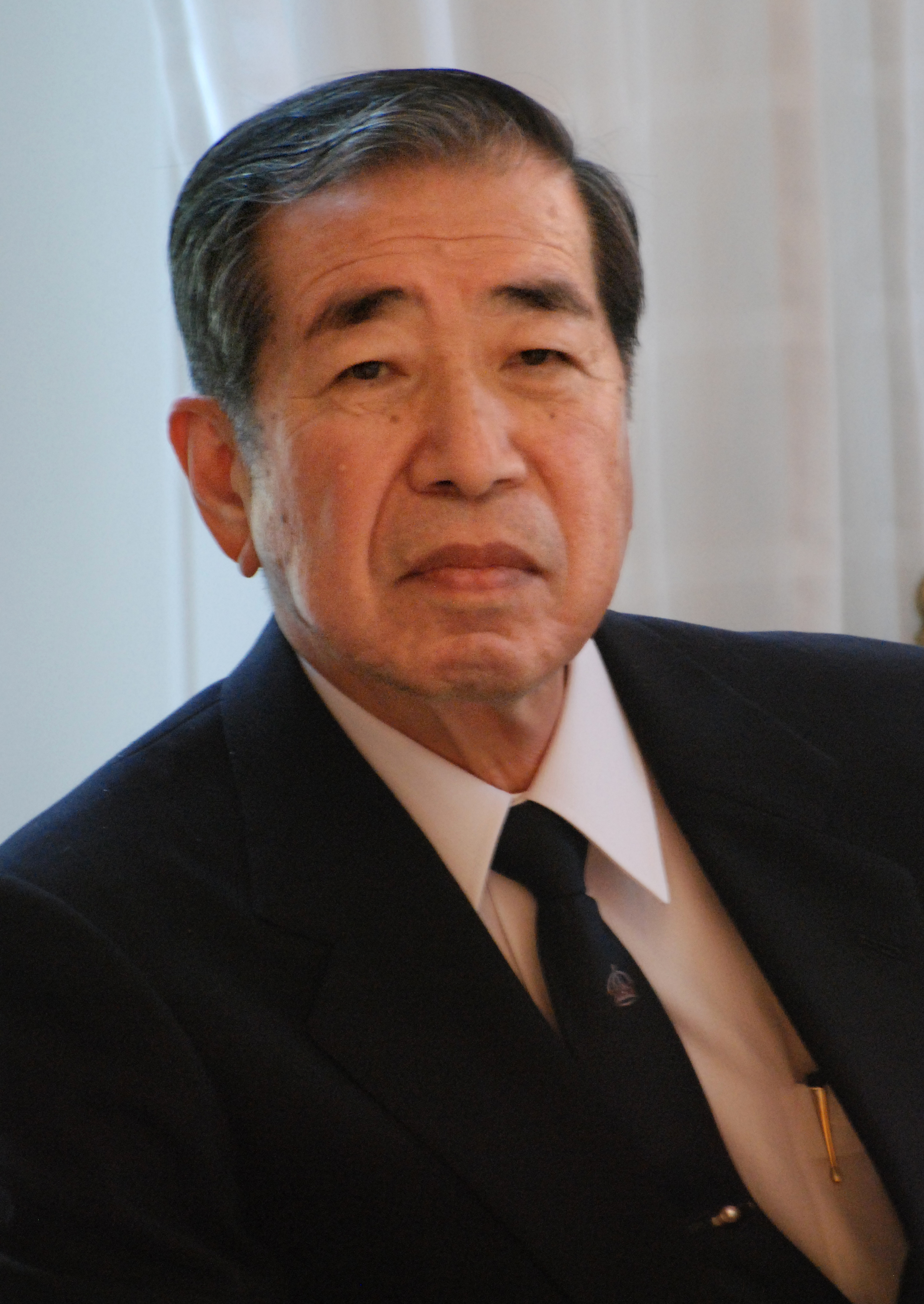
Tadamitsu Kishimoto, 14th President of OU, 2009 Crafoord Prize winner

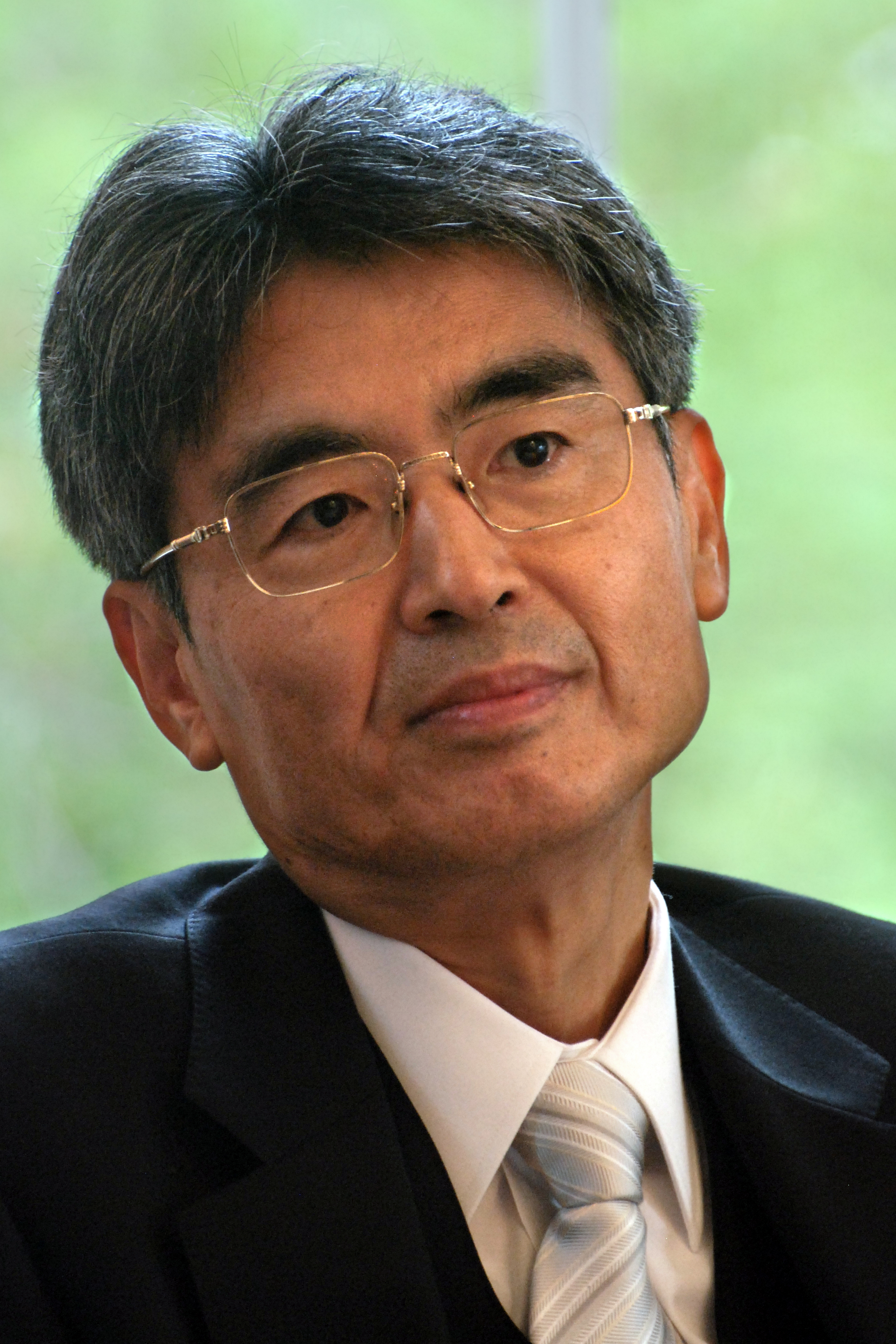
Toshio Hirano, 17th President of OU, 2009 Crafoord Prize winner

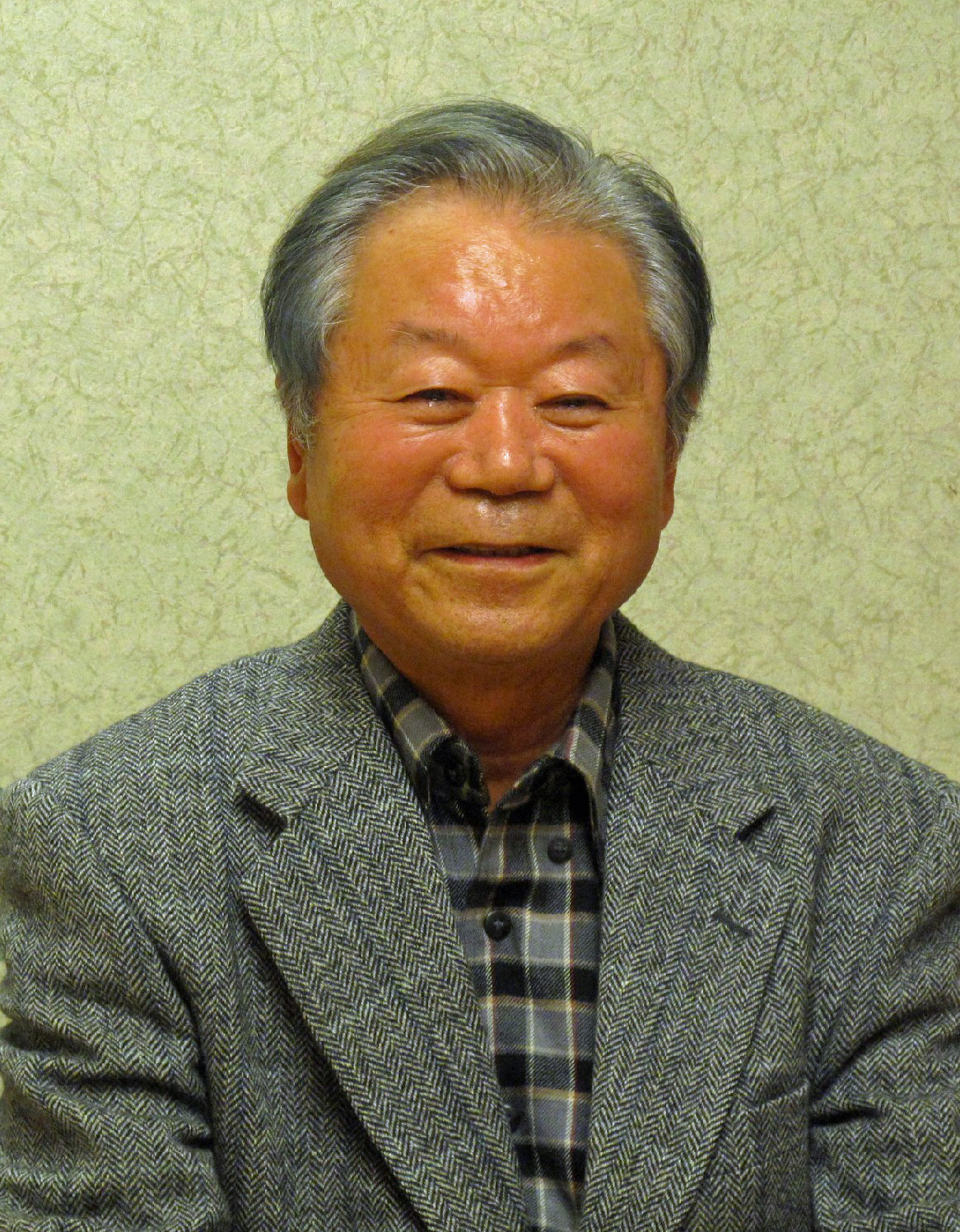
Kenkichi Sonogashira, chemist who discovered the Sonogashira coupling

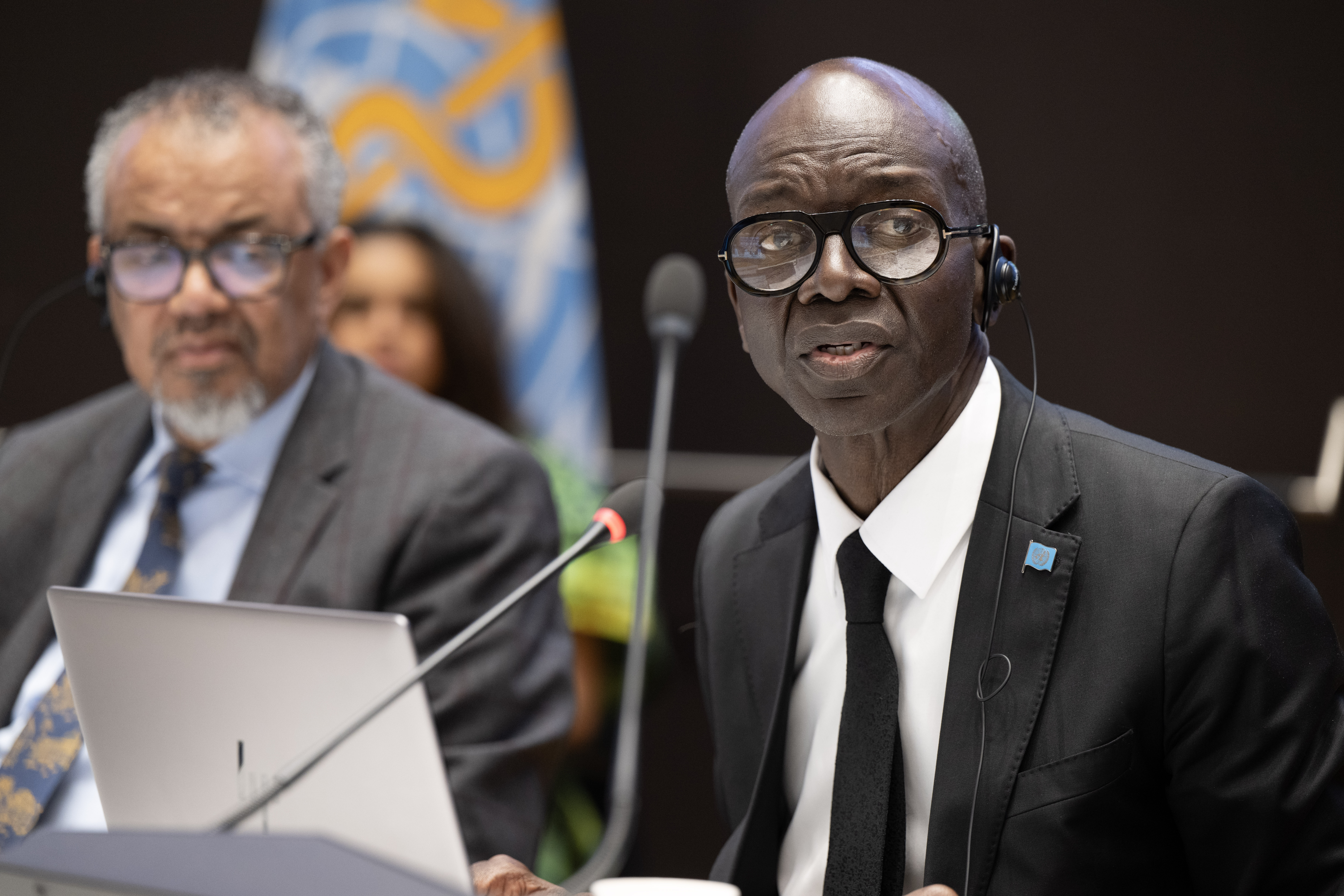
Mohamed Yakub Janabi, Regional Director WHO Regional Office for Africa

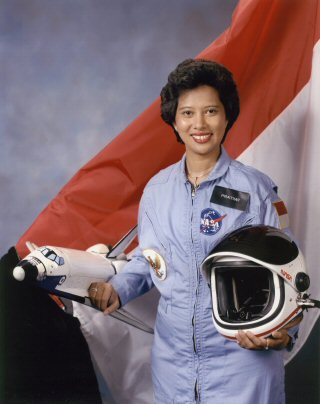
Pratiwi Sudarmono, Indonesian microbiologist
- Shoichi Sakata, physicist, known for Sakata model, Nobel Prize in Physics nominee
- Takeo Matsubara, physicist at Kyoto University, 1961 Nishina Memorial Prize winner
- Oda Minoru, astronomer and astrophysicist, emeritus Professor at the University of Tokyo
- Yoshiaki Arata, pioneering researchers into nuclear fusion
- Shigeo Satomura, Japanese physicist
- Akira Hasegawa, theoretical physicist and engineer
- Takashi Hibiki, professor emeritus of nuclear engineering at Purdue University
- Yasuo Tanaka, Japanese astrophysicist and member of the Japan Academy
- Sonia Contera, Spanish physicist at the University of Oxford
- Satoshi Kawata, scientist in nanotechnology and photonics
- Satoshi Hiyamizu, professor of electrical engineering
- Tadao Kasami, information theorist, IEEE Fellow, 1999 IEEE Claude E. Shannon Award winner
- Tetsuo Asano, computer scientist, the president of the Japan Advanced Institute of Science and Technology (JAIST)
- Wahid Shams Kolahi, Iranian scientist and electrical engineer
- Kilnam Chon, South Korean computer scientist
- Nguyễn Ngọc Bình, Vietnamese computer scientist
- Li Siguang, Chinese geologist and politician
- Yoshio Okamoto, Japanese chemist, 2019 Japan Prize winner
- Yukihiro Ozaki, Japanese scientist at Kwansei Gakuin University
- Tomoaki Kato, pioneer in multiple-organ transplantation
- Toshio Yanagida, Japanese biophysicist
- Yoshizumi Ishino, Japanese molecular biologist, known for his discovery of the DNA sequence of CRISPR
- Kiyoshi Mizuuchi, Japanese biochemist
- Yusuke Nakamura, Japanese prominent geneticist and cancer researcher
- Kiyoshi Nagai, biologist at the MRC Laboratory of Molecular Biology
- Chunshan Song, chemical engineer

=== Mathematics and Economic science ===
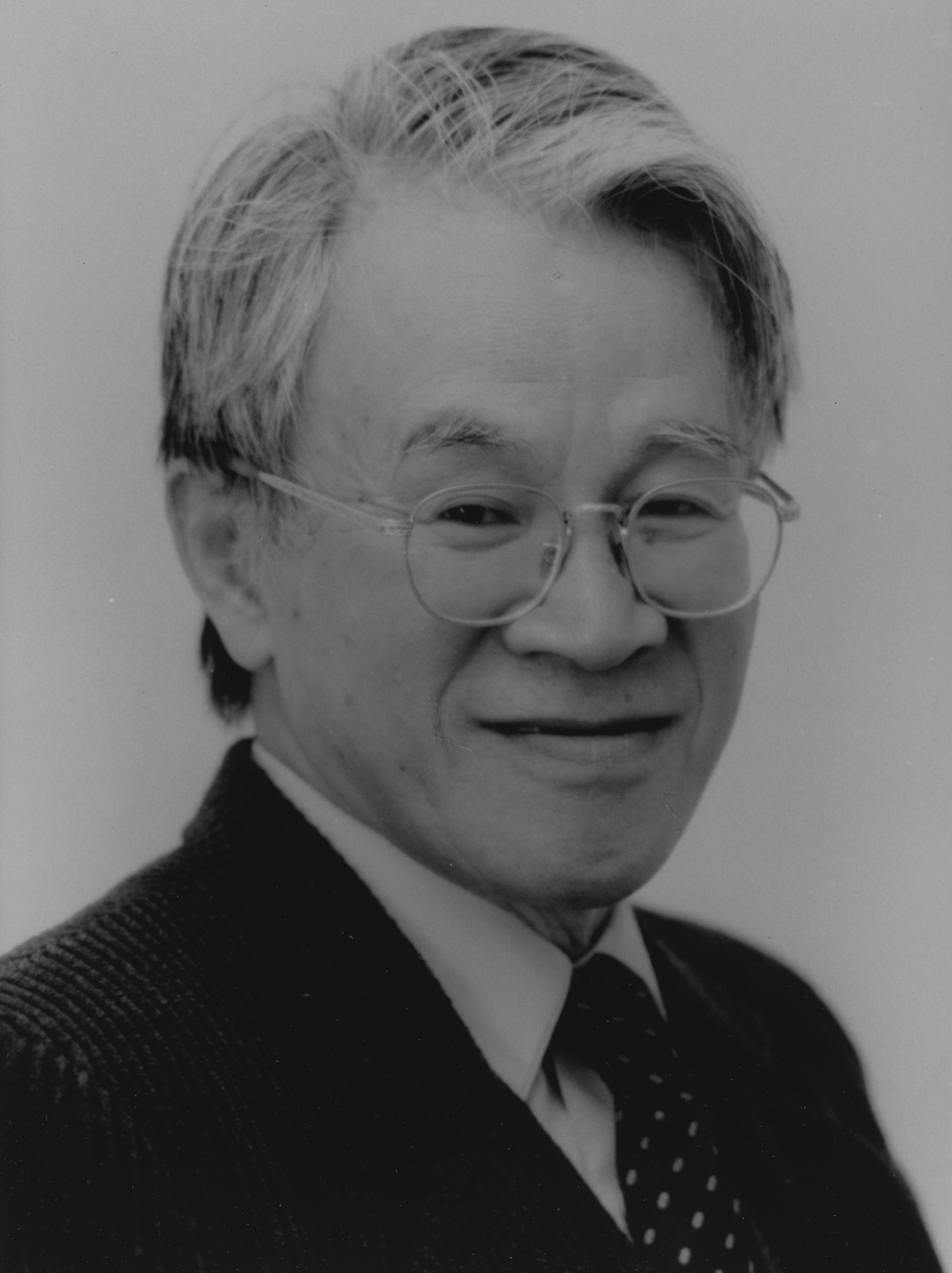
Michio Morishima, co-founder of International Economic Review

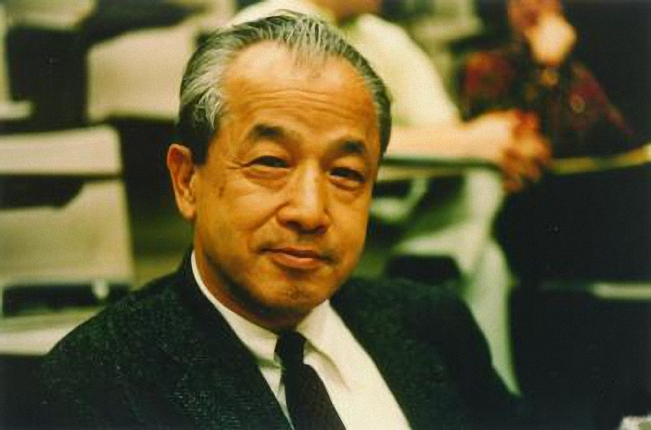
Shizuo Kakutani, mathematician known for Kakutani fixed-point theorem

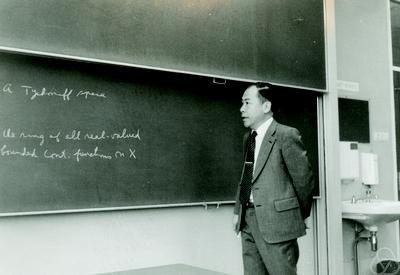
Jun-iti Nagata, topologist

Masatoshi Gündüz Ikeda, Turkish mathematician of Japanese ancestry
- Hiroshi Haruki, mathematician, and author of Haruki's theorem and Haruki's Lemma
- Tadashi Nakayama, mathematician who made important contributions to representation theory
- Katsumi Nomizu, Japanese-American mathematician known for his work in differential geometry
- Hidehiko Yamabe, Japanese mathematician known for Yamabe flow, Yamabe invariant, Yamabe problem
- Toru Kumon, Japanese mathematics educator, developer of Kumon method
- Kengo Hirachi, Japanese mathematician, specializing in CR geometry and mathematical analysis
- Yozo Matsushima, Japanese mathematician
- Masao Ogaki, Japanese economist at Keio University
- Giorgio Brunello, Italian economist
- Kazuya Kamiya, Japanese economics, professor at Kobe University
- Takero Doi, Japanese economist

=== Business and Arts ===
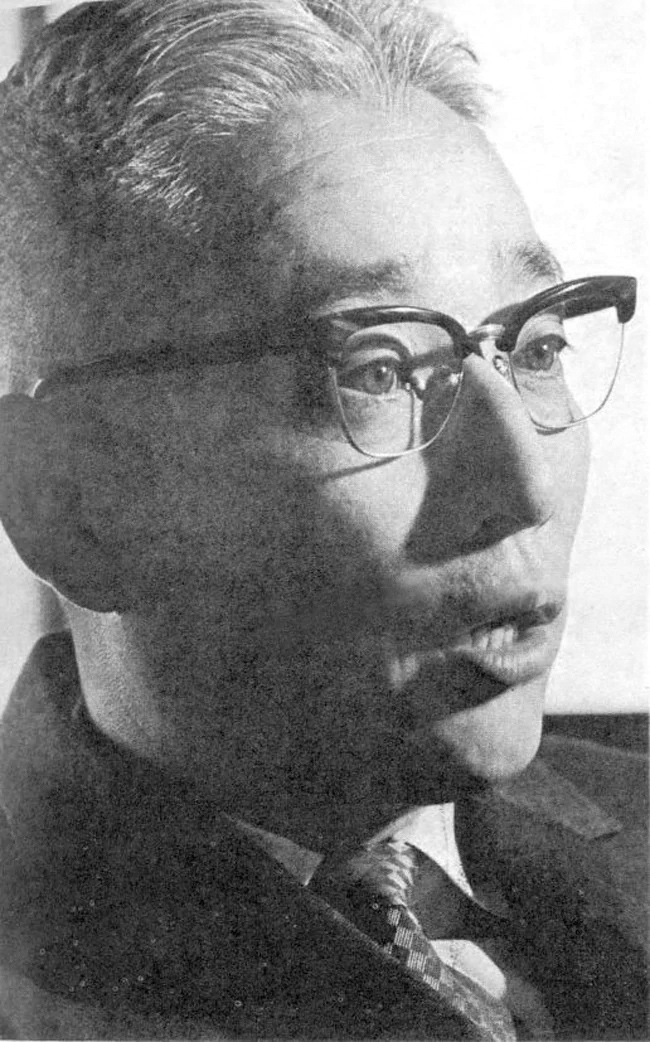
Akio Morita, Sony co-founder, Asian of the Century

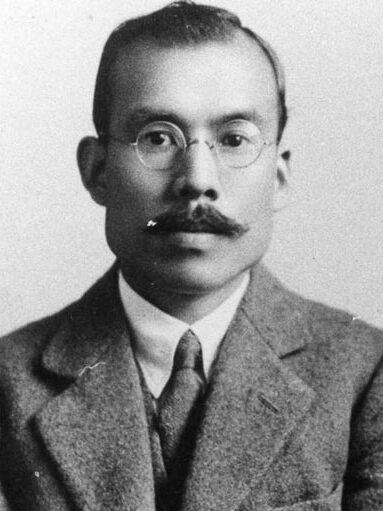
Masataka Taketsuru, father of Japan's whisky industry

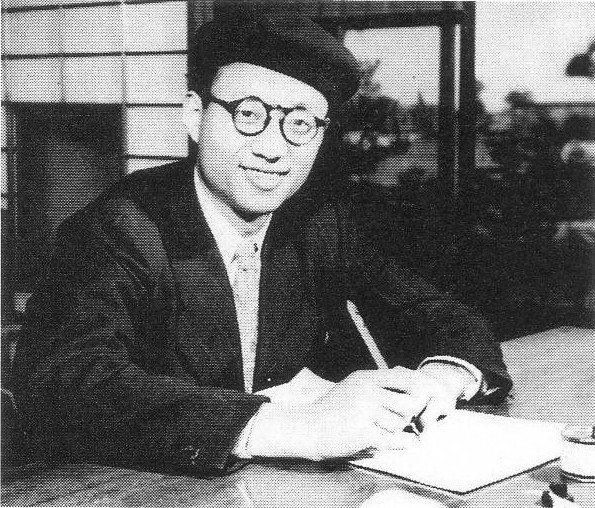
Osamu Tezuka, Japanese manga artist, cartoonist, and animator

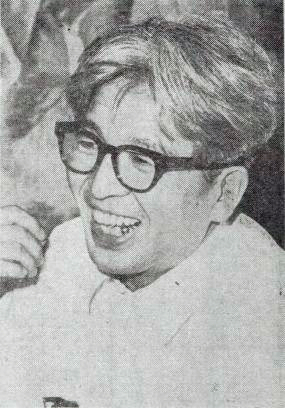
Ryōtarō Shiba, one of the most important writers in contemporary Japan

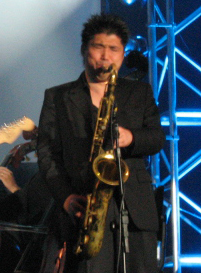
Norihiko Hibino, Japanese video game composer and saxophonist
- Kunio Nakamura, businessman, the president of Panasonic
- Takamitsu Azuma, architect. Professor of UOsaka (1985–1997), emeritus Professor
- Seishi Yokomizo, novelist and creator of the private detective Kosuke Kindaichi
- Toshio Masuda, film director
- Tetsurō Itodani, professional shogi player and Ryūō champion
- Junzo Shono, Japanese novelist, 1954 Akutagawa Prize winner
- Chin Shunshin, Taiwanese-Japanese novelist, 1968 Naoki Prize winner
- Glenn Hook, British academic at the University of Sheffield
- Tatsuhiko Seo, Japanese historian
- Shūdō Higashinakano, Japanese historian
- Yutaka Tsujinaka, professor of political science at the University of Tsukuba
- Keiko McDonald, American orientalist
- Akiko Kiso, Japanese classicist
- Harue Tsutsumi, Japanese playwright
- Koushun Takami, journalist and author of Battle Royale
- Taku Mayumura, Japanese novelist, science fiction writer, 1974 and 1996 Seiun Award winner
- Akira Hori, Japanese science fiction writer, 1980 Nihon SF Taisho Award and Seiun Award winner
- Yasumi Kobayashi, Japanese author of horror, science fiction, and mystery, 2012 and 2017 Seiun Award winner
- Takahiro Kimura, Japanese animator, illustrator and character designer
- Ichirō Sakaki, Japanese light novel writer
- Teiichiro Fujita, Japanese economist and economic historian

=== Politics ===
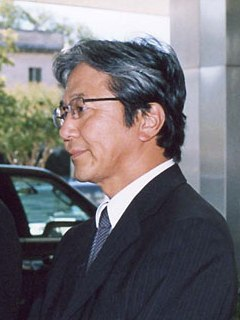
Mitoji Yabunaka, current Japanese Vice-Minister for Foreign Affairs

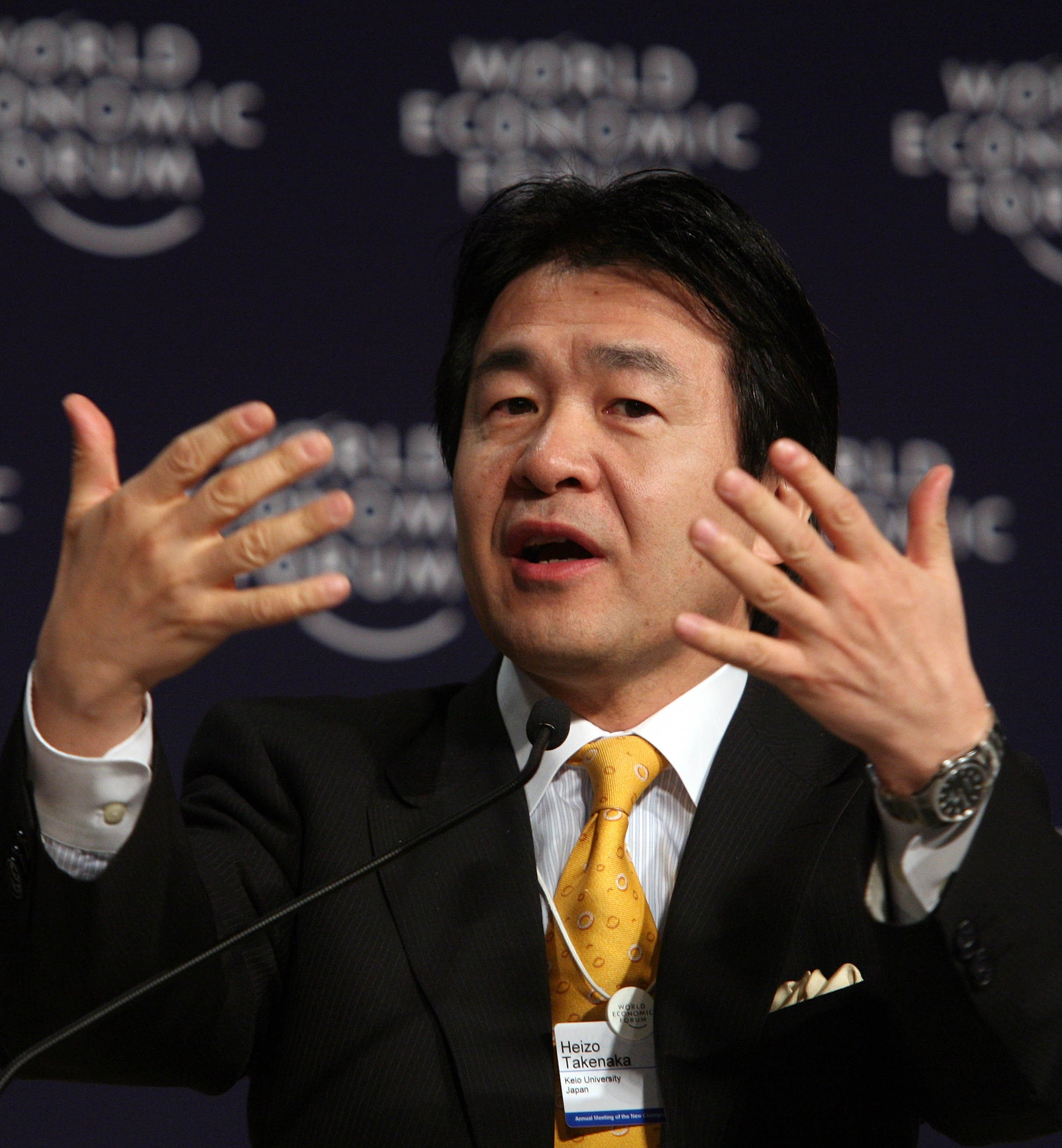
Heizo Takenaka, Minister of Internal Affairs and Communications

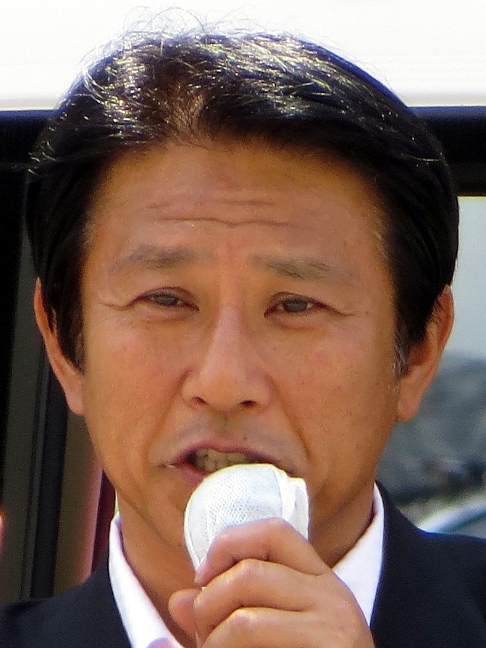
Shinji Tarutoko, former member of the House of Representatives
- Shuzen Tanigawa, Japanese politician of the Liberal Democratic Party, member of the House of Councillors
- Satoshi Umemura, Japanese politician of the Democratic Party of Japan, member of the House of Councillors
- Mitsuo Mitani, Japanese politician of the Democratic Party of Japan, member of the House of Representatives
- Tadashi Maeda, member of the House of Representatives
- Wataru Ito, Japanese politician of the New Komeito Party
- Keisuke Kihara, former mayor of Sakai, Osaka in Japan
- Ko Ko Oo, former Minister of Science and Technology of Burma
- Fathimath Dhiyana Saeed, SAARC Secretary-General
