= Nguyễn Ngọc Bình =

Vietnamese computer scientist

Nguyen Ngoc Binh
- Born: September 17, 1959 (age 66)
- Education: Moldova State University, Toyohashi University of Technology, Osaka University
- Scientific career
- Fields: Computer Science

Nguyễn Ngọc Bình (born 17 September 1959) is a Vietnamese computer scientist. He is the director of the Francophone Institute for Informatics, Vietnam National University.

== Chronology ==
- June 1981 – graduated from Kishinev University (USSR) with B.S. in Applied Mathematics.
- March 1995 – received M.E. in Information and Computer Sciences from Toyohashi University of Technology (Japan)
- March 1998 – received Ph.D. in Information and Computer Sciences from School of Engineering Science, Osaka University (Japan)
- April 1998 – assistant professor at School of Knowledge Science, Japan Advanced Institute of Science and Technology
- August 2000 – head of Department of Software Engineering, Faculty of Information Technology, Hanoi University of Technology (Vietnam)
- May 2009 – was appointed the president of University of Engineering and Technology, VNU for the 2009-2014 period.
- September 2014 - became the director of the Francophone Institute for Informatics, Vietnam National University, Hanoi.

== Awards ==
- Winner of the IEICE Award for Excellent Research Results (from Tokai branch, Japan, 1995).
- Honorary Doctorate from Toyohashi University of Technology.
