= Itō Jinsai =

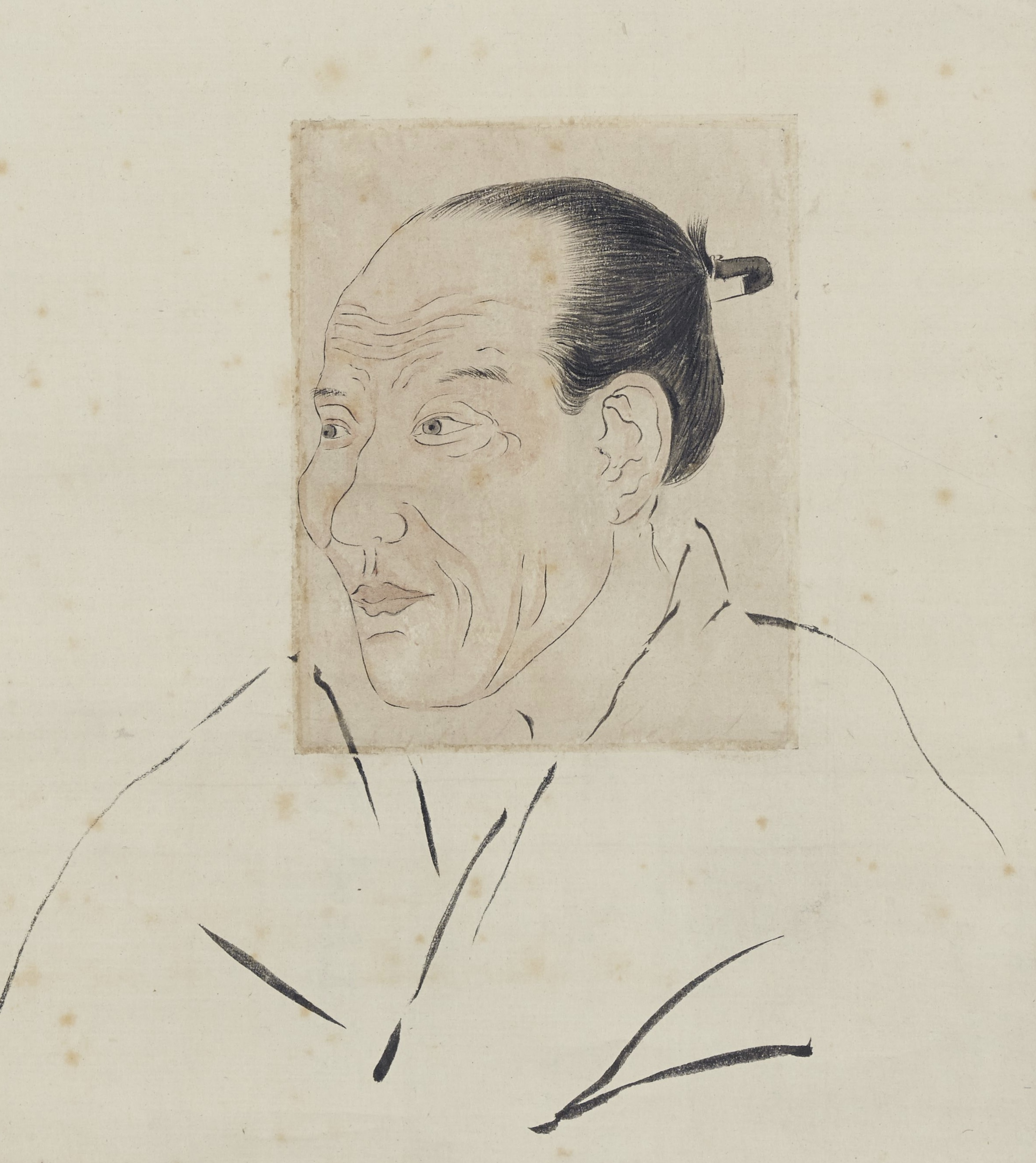
Itō Jinsai drawn by his student

Itō Jinsai (伊藤 仁斎; Japanese pronunciation: [i.toː (|) (d)ʑiꜜɰ̃.sai], August 30, 1627, Kyoto, Japan – April 5, 1705, Kyoto), who also went by the pen name Keisai, was a Japanese Confucian philosopher. He is considered to be one of the most influential Confucian scholars of seventeenth century Japan, and the Tokugawa period (1600–1868) generally, his teachings flourishing especially in Kyoto and the Kansai area through the final years of the Tokugawa shogunate.

Jinsai's school, known as the Kogigaku, criticized the teachings of Song dynasty Chinese philosopher Zhu Xi 朱熹 (1130–1200) and instead advocated a philosophical vision based on an understanding of the meanings of key terms in the Analects and the Mencius. His school has been considered part of a larger movement, Kogaku ("ancient learning'), including earlier scholars such as Yamaga Sokō 山鹿素行 (1622–1685), and later thinkers such as Ogyū Sorai 荻生徂徠 (1666–1728). However, Jinsai never mentions Sokō or his ideas, and Jinsai's own statements of philosophical meaning were strongly and systematically criticized by Sorai. Rather than as a thinker aligned with the so-called Kogaku movement, Jinsai's ideas are best understood on their own terms. Jinsai is widely known for his outspoken affirmation of the validity of human emotions, and his articulation of a metaphysics highlighting the pervasiveness and infinite creative potential of a "unitary generative force" (Jpn: ichigenki). Indicative of his renown in the larger world of East Asian philosophy, Jinsai's writings have frequently been compared to those of the Qing dynasty scholar Dai Zhen 戴震 (1724–1777), whose key work, Mengzi ziyi shuzheng (The Meanings of Philosophical Terms in the Mencius) is very similar in theme and method to Jinsai's opus, the Gomō jigi (The Meanings of Philosophical Terms in the Analects and Mencius).

== Life ==
Jinsai was born the eldest son of a Kyoto merchant, Itō Ryōshitsu. It is not clear exactly what merchant activities the family was engaged in, however. He began studying Chinese from an early age and devoted himself to Zhu Xi's expression of Song dynasty Neo-Confucianism. He continued to study Confucianism throughout his teens, going over old books his uncle had left his father.

By the age of ten, he was studying under his uncle, a noted physician who had once treated the emperor Go-Yōzei. He also likely studied with Matsunaga Sekigo, a Kyoto-based Neo-Confucian scholar who had in turn studied with Fujiwara Seika. Given the distinctively Kyoto lineage of Jinsai's learning, there are good reasons for interpreting it as an expression of the philosophical world of the ancient imperial capital.

Itō suffered from an unidentified illness when he was twenty-eight and left the family business to his younger brother. Afterwards he became a recluse, studying Buddhism and Daoism. During this time he began to have his first doubts over Zhu Xi's philosophy, even changing his pen name which showed his commitment to humaneness (jin).

He later established a private school, the Kogidō, in Kyoto in 1662. Following Jinsai's death in 1705, leadership at the Kogidō was assumed by his son, Tōgai (1670–1736). The Kogidō was located on the east bank of the Horikawa River, directly across from the school of Yamazaki Ansai. During his lifetime, Ansai became a major proponent of Zhu Xi's version of Song Neo-Confucian thought. Jinsai's school, in contrast, offered a sustained critique of Zhu Xi's ideas. Especially in Kyoto, Jinsai's school met with great success, attracting three thousand students from many different classes and professions.

== Teachings ==
Jinsai formed his own understanding of Confucian philosophy after coming to realize that Zhu Xi's speculative philosophy was not practical in everyday ethics. Instead, he felt one could learn the way of the sages through an understanding of the meanings of words in the Analects and the Mencius, two of the Four Books that Zhu Xi's philosophy had elevated to nearly canonical status within the broad field of East Asian Confucianism. The other two of the Four Books, The Doctrine of the Mean and the Great Learning, were originally chapters from the Book of Rites (Chinese: Liji), that had been treated as separate volumes, with significant emendations, by Cheng Yi and Zhu Xi. It was largely on the basis of the latter two writings that Zhu Xi in particular had articulated some of his most distinctive Neo-Confucian ideas. In response to Zhu Xi's textual alterations, Jinsai argued, in a very distinctive manner, that "the Great Learning was not a surviving work of the Confucian School", not simply rejecting Zhu Xi's claims on particular points, but in an across the board manner dismissing the text as "not Confucian" in any significant respect. Instead of the Great Learning, Jinsai's approach was to focus on an explanation of the meanings of philosophical terms as discussed in the Analects and the Mencius. Jinsai's approach to Confucian scholarship is today known as kogigaku or "study of ancient meanings". This approach was taken up by later Confucian scholars, particularly Ogyū Sorai.

In significant respects, Jinsai can be seen as advancing the Neo-Confucian project that Zhu Xi, his chief philosophical adversary, had otherwise so effectively and persuasively championed. For example, Jinsai's most comprehensive philosophical text, the Gomō jigi (The Meanings of Philosophical Terms in the Analects and Mencius), was first recorded as Jinsai was giving a series of lectures on Chen Beixi's 陳北溪 (1156–1223) Xingli ziyi 性理字義 (The Meanings of Neo-Confucian Philosophical Terms). Much of the philosophical structure of Jinsai's Gomō jigi as well as its methodology of conceptual clarification and analysis clearly derive from Beixi's work. The two texts even share common elements in their titles, jigi and ziyi 字義 (Jpn: jigi) being written with the same characters, referring to the meanings of words. In both cases, however, the words that were discussed and defined were distinctively philosophical terms such as tendō (the way of heaven), tenmei (the decree of heaven), michi (the way), sei (human nature), kokoro (the mind and heart), kotowari (principle), kishin (ghosts and spirits), and many others.

Jinsai is often described as an apolitical philosopher. However, the Gomō jigi can easily be seen as an inherently political text, one which defines the very philosophical foundations of an ideal political order. In the Analects, 13/3, Confucius, when asked by a disciple what he would do if given political authority, replied that he would "rectify terms" (zheng ming). When his disciple responded with bewilderment, Confucius explained that if words were not used correctly, then in effect there could be little hope for order in a state. For that reason, Confucius added, the prince is always careful in his use of words. Jinsai's project of defining philosophical terms rightly is very much a later day expression of Confucius' view that in order to govern effectively, one must ensure that words are understood and used correctly. If that is not done, then all will be lost.

Jinsai had several fundamental philosophical disagreements with Zhu Xi, the premier interpreter of Confucian thought since the late-Song dynasty. For one, Zhu Xi had claimed that human nature is inherently good. Jinsai disagreed and instead argued it had the potential to become good, but only through daily practice and deeds can this potential be realized. Additionally, he rejected the dualism of rational principal (li) and material force (qi) proposed by Song Confucianism, believing it was material force alone that led to the creation of life and all things.

Furthermore, Zhu Xi connected the way of heaven (tendō) with the human way (jindō) through rational principal. Jinsai on the other hand saw the way (michi) as being embedded in the common and everyday, and not ensconced on some elevated plane as Zhu had suggested. To Jinsai, the central question was how one should conduct oneself in everyday life. Zhu Xi affirmed that all humans are born with an "original human nature" (sei), which is naturally good. Jinsai, however, rejected this.

Rather than the essential goodness of human nature, Jinsai stressed natural human emotions (ninjō), which he found in everyday life. Extending from this came the importance that was placed on poetry which allowed for the expression of human emotions. This, he believed, provided a needed release of emotions and desires. Song Confucianism he felt too much advocated seriousness and a restraint of human nature. His support for literature even led to the Kogidō attracting some students more interested in Chinese poetry than his Confucian teachings.

Although often grouped with the Edo Confucian scholar, Ogyū Sorai, as a proponent of the ancient learning movement, Jinsai's singlemost harsh critic was none other than Sorai. In a letter written to Jinsai, Sorai early on expressed admiration for the Kyoto philosopher and an interest in his philosophy, having read a pirated edition of Jinsai's Gomō jigi published long before Jinsai was ready for it to be released in its final form. Jinsai never responded to Sorai, apparently wounding his pride deeply. Whatever Sorai might have made of Jinsai's silence, it is clear that in Sorai's later writings, in the Bendō and Benmei (1728) in particular, Sorai takes issue with Jinsai on nearly every count, often criticizing him harshly as in effect no different in philosophical doctrine than the thinker he supposedly was criticizing, Zhu Xi.

In the later writings of the Kaitokudō, a merchant academy based in Osaka, Jinsai found a succession of defenders who returned Sorai's critiques with a series of harsh responses to Sorai's own philosophical statements.

== Works ==
- Gomō jigi 1705 (The Meaning of Words in the Analects and Mencius).
- Dōjimon 1705 (Questions From Children).
- Daigaku teihon 1705 (The Established Text of the Great Learning).
- Hakushimonjū 1704 (Postscripts to the Collected Works of Bo Juyi).
