= Yamagata Bantō =

Japanese scholar (1748–1821)

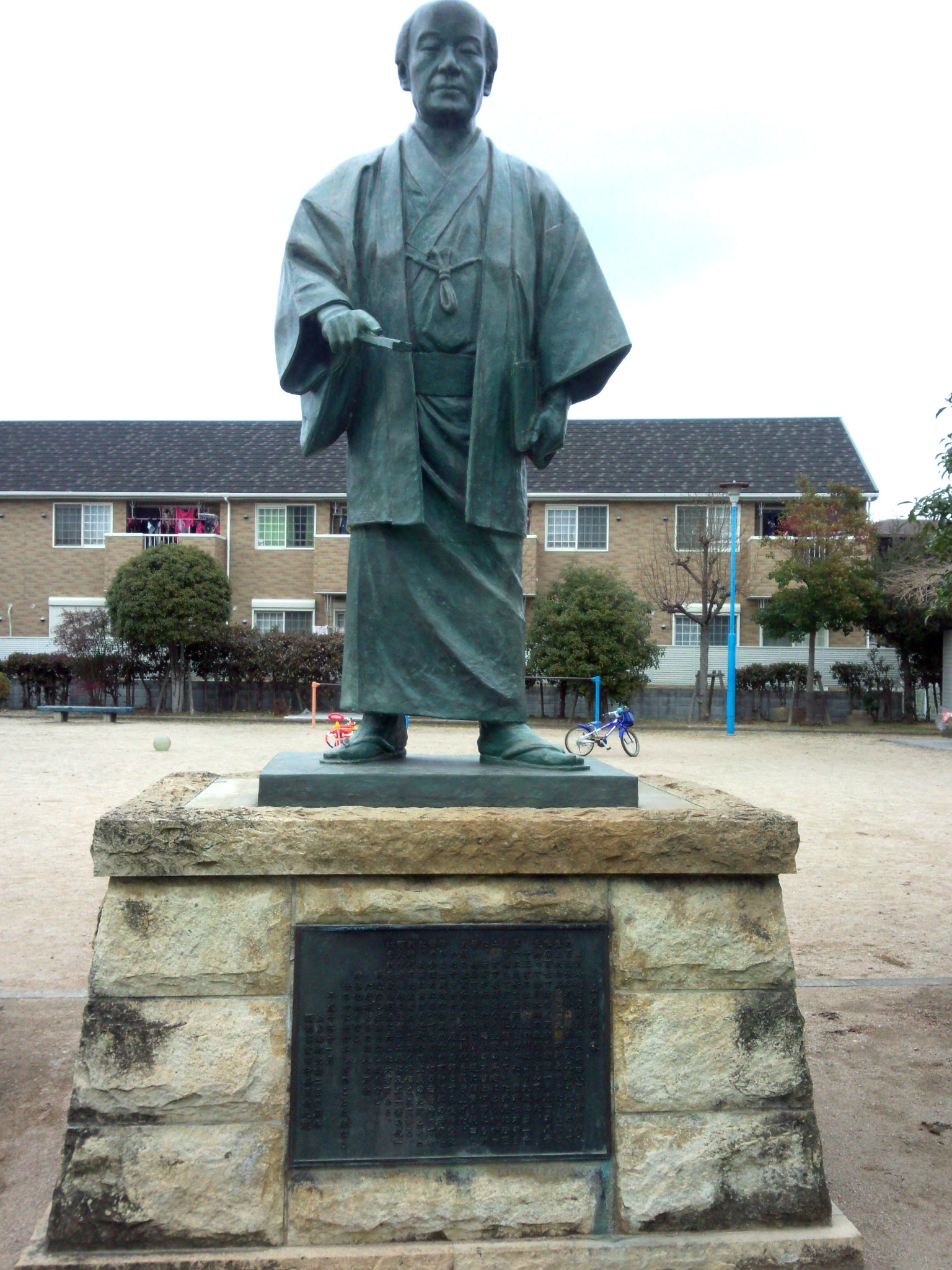
- statue of Yamagata Bantō
- Born: 1748; Kazume Village, Innami Gun, Harima (At present : Kazume, Takasago, Hyogo)
- Died: 1821-03-31 (Aged 72-73)
- Other names: Hasegawa Yoshihide; Masuya Shozaemon

Yamagata Bantō (山片 蟠桃; 1748–1821) was a well-known resident of Osaka who was both a scholar and a merchant. He was the able head clerk of the money exchange merchant Masuya. He studied Confucianism from Nakai Chikuzan and his brother Nakai Riken, and astronomy from Asada Goryu at the Kaitokudō School during its golden age. Despite his poor eyesight, he devoted 18 years to writing the book titled "Yumenoshiro" or "Instead of Dreams" which had as many as 12 volumes. In this book he supported the heliocentric theory, criticized the age of gods and advocated atheism. However, in his theory of the state he was conservative, stating that "feudalism is the great natural way of the realm and what kings delight in," affirming the existing order and taking a position favorable to the shogunate, such as reverence for the emperor and respect for the shogunate. on the gods, he wrote that they were nonexistent, and said that Confucius was also an atheist, like him, and that religion was invented to keep people moral, saying "I do not condemn gods, but respect them. I wrote that there are no spirits, no benefits from them and no gods in this book while respecting them." He was also a supporter of the veneration of ancestors. He famously summed up his views in a poem: There is no hell, no heaven, no self Only humankind and the ten thousand things. In this world there are no gods, Buddhas or demons, There are surely no mysterious and miraculous happenings.

Osaka Prefecture recently established a prize of international culture named the Yamagata Banto Prize.
