= Ishida Baigan =

Ishida Baigan (石田 梅岩; October 12, 1685 – October 29, 1744) was a Japanese lecturer and philosopher, born in Tanba Province, who founded the Shingaku movement (heart learning) based on Neo-Confucianism, the study of the doctrines of Zhu Xi, incorporating Shinto, Buddhism and so on, which advocated all education include teachings in ethics and morality.

His life work has been summarized with the Confucian idea that a man that cannot control his home cannot control his nation. This idea helped motivate many Japanese reformists fighting for Japanese feminists, human, and people's rights.
