= Nakai Chikuzan =

Japanese academic

Nakai Chikuzan (中井 竹山, 1730–1804) was a leading academic in the Kaitokudō academy tradition of scholarship. He was the first son of Nakai Shuan (d. 1758), one of the Kaitokudō's two founders, and was influenced by his teacher and mentor Goi Ranju (五井蘭洲:1697-1762). He became the administrative head of the Kaitokudō in 1797 during the Tokugawa period in Japan.

An extrovert known for his bureaucratic skills and his firm precise kanji, Chikuzan was vastly different in demeanour to his brother Nakai Riken, although their underlying epistemologies, beliefs and degree of tenacious individualism were similar. They both focused on the epistemological study of virtue in the merchant class of Tokugawa Japan, furthering the work of Goi Ranju and consolidating previous thought around the Kaitokudō school. Together, through their scholarly works they would bring a level of prestige to the Kaitokudō with their study of virtue. Ultimately they wanted to reconcile merchants and contemporary views of merchants in Tokugawa society.

== Life and Philosophy ==
The first son of Nakai Shuan, one of the two main founders of the Kaitokudo, he was just as adept in the external bureaucratic maneuvering of administration as his father. He attended the Kaitokudo from a young age, where his interests in the epistemological study of virtue were cultivated by the scholar Goi Ranju. Both felt that education should be their primary concern rather than working on the side to supplement their income, something symptomatic of many Jusha who preferred to operate pharmacies on the side. This earned them scorn from many of the Osaka merchants who contributed to the school's cost of operation. Both he and his brother Rikan took care of the elderly Goi in his later years, something for which both are remembered. While he was of superior intellectual capabilities compared to the successor his father supported in the academy, Miyake Shunro, his father subtly made a position of leadership for his son. Shuan left a fund of twenty kan to insure against emergencies to be managed by Chikuzan. In this way Shunro would be responsible for formal activities and Chikuzan would be in charge of financial activities "to assure the immortality of the academy-Eitai sōzoku no yō". (Najita 151–152).

Chikuzan whole-heartedly denounced Ogyū Sorai and contended that all people have potential, even commoners could become scholars, while he also denounced religion and superstition.

== Works ==
- Hi-Cho – an emotional work written to denounce Ogyū Sorai and his historicism. Said that Sorai simplified things too much and mistranslated the ancient works Mencius, Analects, etc. Was accused of attacking the person Sorai rather than the person's arguments in this work.
- Isshi 1797 – a laudatory history that underwent many drafts during the Tokugawa Bakufu. This body of work upset his brother due to the work's apologetic bias. This bias also earned him the respect and affection of the Bakufu. A work that reflects his own form of realpolitik. This was a way for him to gain assurance from the Bakufu to continue running the Kaitokudo but corrupted his academic integrity.
- Sobo kigen
