= Ogyū Sorai =

Japanese philosopher (1666–1728)

- 荻生 徂徠
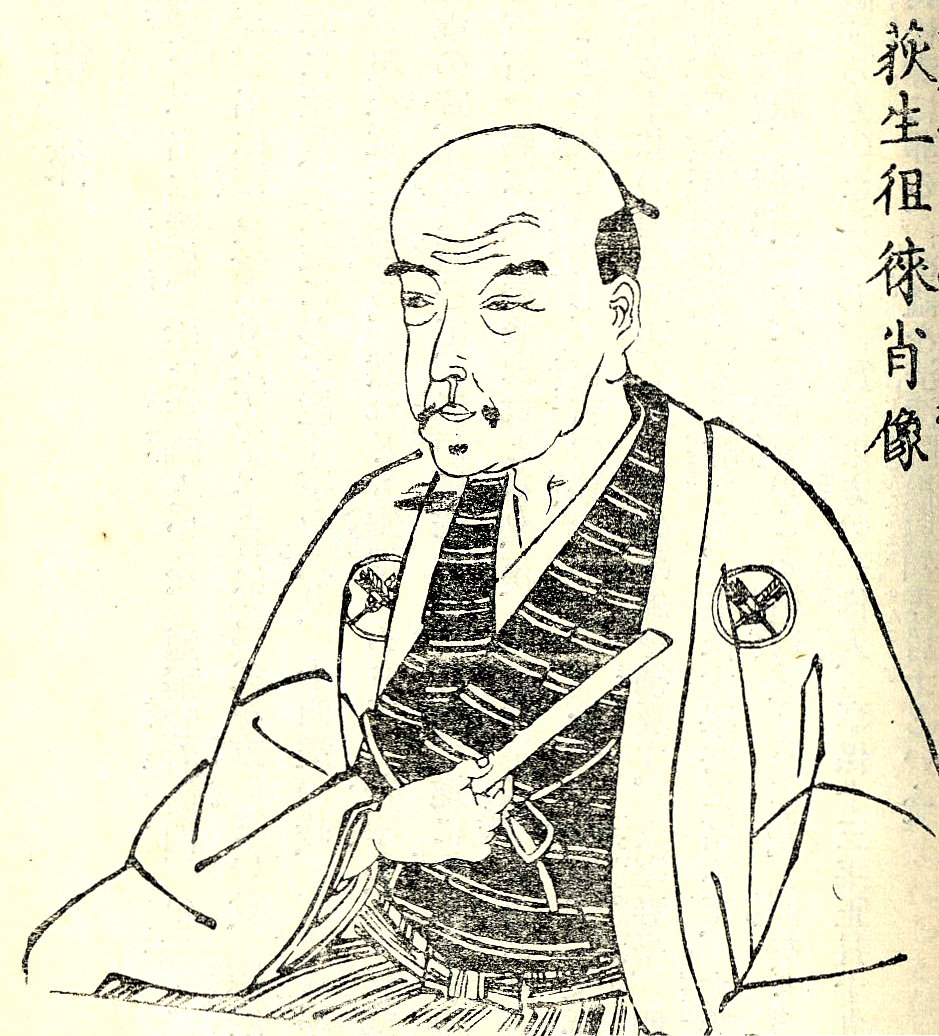
- Ogyū Sorai from Japanese book 『先哲像伝』
- Born: March 21, 1666; Edo, Japan
- Died: February 28, 1728 (aged 61); Edo, Japan
- Occupations: Historian, philologist, philosopher, translator

Ogyū Sorai (荻生 徂徠; Japanese pronunciation: [o.ɡʲɯː (|) soꜜ.ɾai, o.ŋʲɯː-], March 21, 1666 – February 28, 1728), pen name Butsusorai/Bussorai (物徂徠), was a Japanese historian, philologist, philosopher, and translator. He has been described as the most influential such scholar during the Edo period Japan. His primary area of study was in applying the teachings of Confucianism to government and social order. He responded to contemporary economic and political failings of the Tokugawa shogunate, as well as the culture of mercantilism and the dominance of old institutions that had become weak with extravagance. Sorai rejected the moralism of Neo-Confucianism and instead looked to the ancient works. He argued that allowing emotions to be expressed was important and nurtured Chinese literature in Japan for this reason. Sorai attracted a large following with his teachings and created the Sorai school, which would become an influential force in further Confucian scholarship in Japan.

== Biography ==
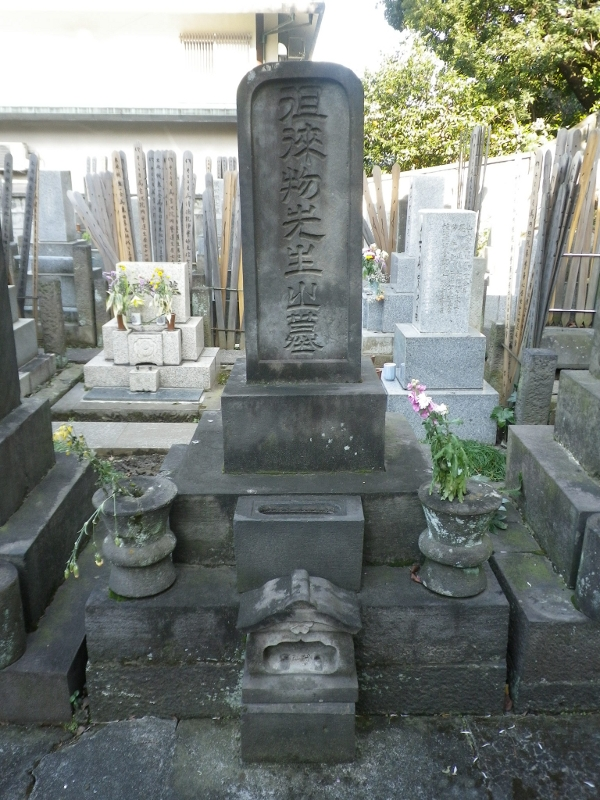
Grave of Ogyū Sorai

Sorai was born in Edo the second son of a samurai who served as the personal physician of Tokugawa Tsunayoshi, who was at the time daimyō of Tatebayashi Domain. At an early age, Sorai studied the Zhu Xi version of Neo-Confucianism under Hayashi Gahō and Hayashi Hōkō; however, his father was exiled in 1679 to a rural village what is now Mobara, Chiba after angering Tsunayoshi. In this rustic setting, he continued to study the major Chinese classics, as well as Japanese and Buddhist texts on his own for the next 13 years, which formed the foundations for his later philosophy. In 1692, Sorai's father was pardoned, and the family moved back to Edo. Sorai opened a school near the temple of Zōjō-ji to teach Chinese classics, and in 1696 received a position in the service of Yanagisawa Yoshiyasu, a senior councillor to the now Shōgun Tokugawa Tsunayoshi. Sorai was assigned to serve Yanagisawa in his domain of Kawagoe. Later, he was granted income of 500 koku, and was assigned to Yoshiyasu's Edo residence, where he provide advice on political issues. One of these issues involved the Akō vendetta in which the Forty-seven rōnin avenged their fallen lord by killing Kira Yoshinaka in 1702. Whereas Muro Kyūsō, Hayashi Hōkō and others praised the actions of the rōnin for their loyalty, Sorai took the opposite stance and argued that they should be forced to commit seppuku, for regardless of the "righteousness" of their actions and the weight of public opinion, the fact that they committed a capital offense was undeniable, and the rule of the law must be impartial.

In 1705, Yoshiyasu became daimyō of Kōfu Domain. Sorai remained in Edo, but visited Kai Province in 1706 at the behest of Yoshiyasu, and wrote a travelogue of the journey, In 1709, following the death of Tokigawa Tsunayoshi, Yanagisawa Yoshiyasu fell from favor, and Sorai left his service and relocated to Nihonbashi, where he opened a private school, the Kenenjuku.He gradually turned away from the teachings of Zhu Xi to develop his own philosophy and school.

In 1722, Sorai was asked to return to public office under the 8th Shogun, Tokugawa Yoshimune, but he refused. He continued to teach until his death in 1728. His grave is located at the temple of Chōshō-ji in Mita, Minato, Tokyo (35°38′38.4″N 139°44′16.2″E). The gravestone has the inscription Sorai-mono sensei no haka (徂徠物先生之墓) in front and an inscription on the back stating that the epitaph was by Honda Tadanori and the writing by the noted calligrapher Matsushita Useki. The tomb was designated a National Historic Site in 1949 .

== Teachings ==
Sorai wrote several influential works in which he identified two fundamental weaknesses in the philosophy of Neo-Confucianism. The first was in the bakufu-domain system, which by the eighteenth century was in trouble. As a result, he doubted whether the reliance on finding an individual's ethical good was sufficient. As such he argued that the political crisis of the time required more than perfecting moral character. Moreover, he saw the ancient Chinese sage-kings as concerned not only with morality but also with government itself. His second disagreement with Neo-Confucianism was that he felt putting too much emphasis on morality repressed human nature, which was based on human emotion.

However, these weaknesses he felt stemmed not from a deficiency in Confucianism itself, but rather from a misreading of classic works of the Four Books and the Five Classics by Neo-Confucianists, which he insisted "did not know the old words." Sorai went back to the ancient works for more reliable knowledge, stating "The ultimate form of scholarly knowledge is history." To him, these historical works were the ultimate source, even for an ever-changing present. Sorai thought that study of philosophy began with the study of language. In this he was highly influenced by the Ancient Rhetoric school of the Ming period, which was a neoclassical movement that saw the Qin and Han periods as the model for prose, and the Tang period for poetry. The Sorai school introduced Selections of Tang Poetry, a work thought to have been edited by Li Panlong (李攀竜 1514–70), a founder of the Ancient Rhetoric school, to Japan, where it became very popular. As a result, his school is today sometimes also known as the Ancient Rhetoric (kobunji 古文辞) school. However it differed in that he saw it mostly as a means of accessing the Five Classics. He would also accuse other Confucianists in Japan, such as Hayashi Razan, of relying too heavily on Song sources such as Zhu Xi.

Sorai further differed from the Neo-Confucian viewpoints in other aspects. One was that the Way was not a predetermined principle of the universe, but rather an establishment of men, of the ancient sages who described it in the Confucianist classic works. These works provided for the Way, which was divided by rites (rei 礼) and music (gaku 楽). The former gave social order, while the latter was inspiration for the heart. In this it directly allowed for the flow of human emotions, something denied by the moralist philosophy of Song Confucianism. Sorai argued for the opposite, allowing one to be enriched through music and poetry. As a result of his teachings in putting emphasis on literature as a fundamental form of human expression, Chinese writing would begin to thrive in Japan, becoming an accepted artistic pursuit. His school would thus produce several such great writers of Chinese composition at that time.

Sorai was furthermore a supporter of the samurai class. Institutions that were once under great leadership will later decline and more able men will be less likely to come to power. The samurai, he felt, were best able to overcome this through a system of rewards and punishment. He also saw problems with the merchant class at the time, which he accused of conspiring to fix prices. He was not, however, a great supporter of the lower classes. He argued, "What possible value can there be for the common people to overreach their proper station in life and study such books [as the Confucian classics]?"

Some later scholars criticised his work and found his teaching to be impractical. Goi Ranshū believed that Sorai was motivated to surpass Itō Jinsai, another Confucianist who had influenced him a great deal, and that Sorai took his arguments to the level of absurdity for this reason. Had any of his teachings actually been implemented, Goi felt it would have caused extensive damage to moral philosophy. Another later scholar critical of Ogyū's teachings was Nakai Chikuzan, who was also familiar with Goi's opposition to Ogyū Sorai. Goi wrote his opposition to Sorai in his essay Hi-Butsu hen, which was written in the 1730s, but not published until 1766 having been edited by Chikuzan and his brother. Nakai later wrote his own, highly emotional, rebuttal to Ogyū's beliefs in his work Hi-Chō (1785), wherein he rejected the idea that individuals could not better themselves through moral choices. Moreover, he claimed individuals were able to judge whether external ideas and actions were true and just or not. Denial of these morals, he felt, would leave only "rites and rules" to be followed.

=== Master Sorai's Teachings ===
Master Sorai's Teachings is a record of his teaching and exchanges with his students. The text was edited by his own students and contained their questions followed by his answers to them. The work was not released until 1724, but is thought to have actually taken place around 1720. In it he reinforces that literature is not so much intended for the purposes of instruction in morality or governance, but rather it simply allows for the flow of human emotions. From this, answers on the former topics may be found, he argued. While Ogyu sought to redefine the sources of Tokugawa legitimacy, his purpose was clearly to strengthen the authority of the Tokugawa shogunate.

== Economic contributions ==
Though Sorai was best known for being a teacher of Confucianism, he was also called on to find answers to some of the issues in the growing economy, the most notable of which was the rising inflation and prices that began after the debasement of coinage in 1695. The Tokugawa shogunate carried out a total of 12 recoinages between 1695 and the start of the Meiji Restoration in 1868 debasing the currency in an attempt to match the rising demand for money as the commercial economy rapidly expanded. There was an attempt to quell the inflation and high prices in 1714, when the government reminted coins in an effort to reduce the amount of gold in circulation. However, this exacerbated the problem as the old coins remained in circulation alongside the newly minted coins. In response to the currency reforms, Sorai noted that the monetary policies enacted failed as they accounted for only one of the causes of high prices and inflation. Sorai realized that there were more than just monetary influences that needed to be taken into account to address the problem. He noted that since the large cities like Edo had become the center of large markets one had to consider the costs of tariffs and transportation from distant provinces as well as the costs of land and housing in the cities into final prices. Additionally, there was a breakdown of the traditional class distinctions: commoners were able to buy goods that were once reserved for the higher classes, which pushed up prices. Finally, he pointed out that as the merchant class grew in power, it began to collude and fix prices above what was normal. It was all of these factors together, in addition to the monetary influences, that caused wealth and power to shift away from the shogun and into the hands of the merchants, which prompted the debasement of coinage, leading to inflation and exorbitant prices.

== Works ==
- Regulations for Study (Gakusoku, 1715)
- Distinguishing the Way (Bendō, 1717)
- Master Sorai's Teachings (Sorai sensei tōmonsho, 1724)

He has also been credited for the invention of ko shogi, a large shogi variant, dated to before 1694.

== Bibliography ==
- Najita, Tetsuo. (1998). Visions of Virtue in Tokugawa Japan. Honolulu: University of Hawaii Press. ISBN 0-8248-1991-8
- Shirane, Haruo. (2006). Early Modern Japanese Literature. New York: Columbia University Press. ISBN 0-231-10990-3
- Totman, Conrad. (1982). Japan Before Perry. Berkeley: University of California Press. ISBN 0-520-04134-8
- Tucker, J., ed. (2006). Ogyu Sorai’s Philosophical Masterworks: The Bendo And Benmei (Asian Interactions and Comparisons). Honolulu: University of Hawaii Press. ISBN 978-0-8248-2951-3
- Yamashita, Samuel Hideo. (1994). Master Sorai's Responsals: An Annotated Translation of Sorai Sensei Tōmonsho. Honolulu: University of Hawaii Press. ISBN 978-0-8248-1570-7
- Translation of some chapters of Ogyû Sorai's On Distinguishing Names
- Morris-Suzuki, Tessa. (1989). A History of Japanese Economic Thought. London & New York: Routledge. ISBN 0-415-07168-2
