= Carbon dioxide reforming =

Carbon dioxide reforming (also known as dry reforming) is a method of producing synthesis gas (mixtures of hydrogen and carbon monoxide) from the reaction of carbon dioxide with hydrocarbons such as methane with the aid of metal catalysts (typically Ni or Ni alloys). Synthesis gas is conventionally produced via the steam reforming reaction or coal gasification. In recent years, increased concerns on the contribution of greenhouse gases to global warming have increased interest in the replacement of steam as reactant with carbon dioxide.

The dry reforming reaction may be represented by:

$$\ce{CH4 + CO2 <=>[975^oC] 2CO + 2H2}$$

Thus, two greenhouse gases are consumed and useful chemical building blocks, hydrogen and carbon monoxide, are produced. A challenge to the commercialization of this process is that the hydrogen that is produced tends to react with carbon dioxide. For example, the following reaction typically proceeds with lower activation energy than the dry reforming reaction itself:

$$\ce{CO + H2O <=>[600^oC] CO2 + H2}$$

Another issue with dry reforming is situated in the fact that it operates at conditions that produces water. As a result, this water can lead to unwanted back-reaction to CO_{2} via the water-gas shift reaction. To prevent CO_{2} from being formed, and consequently losses in CO yield, CO_{2} can be adsorbed onto calcium oxide. Consequently, the process forms only CO and H_{2}O, increasing the utilization efficiency of the feedstocks. This process is better known as super-dry reforming.

CO_{2} can be dry reformed in to CO gas at 800-850 °C by reacting with petcoke, biochar, coal, etc. using low cost iron based catalysts. Using cheaper renewable electricity like solar or wind energy, this cheaper method converts petcoke and green house gas CO_{2} in to useful fuel like methanol achieving carbon capture and utilization. Some CO gas is converted in to hydrogen via water-gas shift reaction.
