= Shingaku =

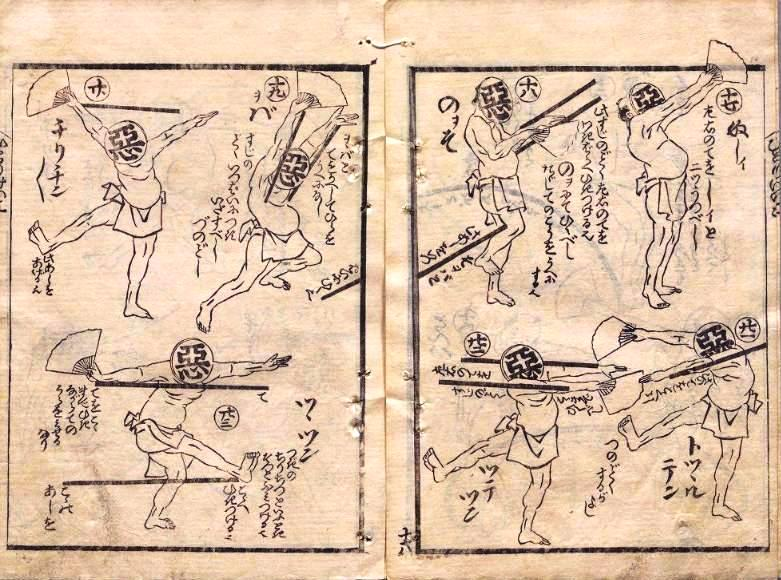
Shingaku made use of specific dances to illustrate its worldview.

Shingaku (心学, lit. "heart learning") or Sekimon-shingaku (石門心学) is a Japanese religious movement, founded by Ishida Baigan and further developed by Teshima Toan, which was especially influential during the Tokugawa period. Shingaku has been characterized as coming from the Neo-Confucian tradition, integrating principles from Zen Buddhism and Shinto (Chang 2010). It has been speculated that Shingaku was one of the cultural foundations for Japan's industrialization. (Sawada, 1993; Bellah, 1957)
