= Department of Economics (University of Pennsylvania) =

- Type: Academic department
- Parent institution: University of Pennsylvania School of Arts and Sciences
- Location: Philadelphia, Pennsylvania, United States
- Website: economics.sas.upenn.edu

The Department of Economics (branded as Penn Economics) is an academic department at the School of Arts and Sciences at the University of Pennsylvania in Philadelphia, Pennsylvania, United States.

Penn Economics is generally associated with the saltwater school of economic thought (along with University of California, Berkeley, Brown University, Harvard University, Princeton University, Columbia University, MIT and Yale University). It is located in the Ronald O. Perelman Center for Political Science and Economics in Philadelphia, Pennsylvania.

== History ==
Edmund J. James
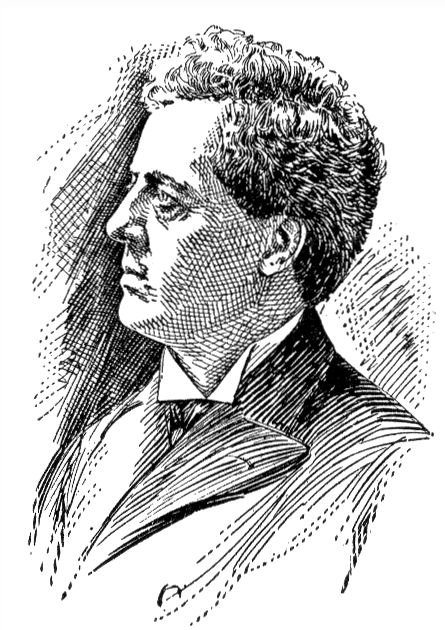
- Edmund J. James, the first professor of economics at Penn

The social sciences began to be offered in Penn's curriculum beginning in the 1870s. Then, Robert Ellis Thompson (1844–1924) was chosen as Penn's first Professor of Social Sciences in 1874. In 1883, Edmund J. James, the first professor of economics, joined the university as a professor and began teaching courses in economics. He was a founding member of the American Economic Association and the American Academy of Political and Social Science. Other notably economists who joined the department in the nineteenth century included Roland P. Falkner (1888), James Harvey Robinson (1891), Albert S. Bolles (1891), Sidney Sherwood (1891), Emory R. Johnson (1893), and Joseph French Johnson (1893).

The university as a whole modeled its graduate school on the German model of education, emphasizing a combination of research and pedagogy. Upon graduation, students received a Bachelor of Science in Economics.

In 2013, the department received $25 million for the establishment of the Ronald O. Perelman Center for Political Science and Economics, where it currently resides.

== Academics ==
The Department's undergraduate program is one of the largest in the School of Arts and Sciences. Students enrolled in Wharton as undergraduates share some of the classes with students from the Economics Department, but the two degrees have otherwise separate curriculum. The department offers two majors: an economics major and a mathematical economics major.

It also offers graduate courses leading to a Ph.D. in economics. There are currently more than 100 students within the graduate program.

=== Penn Institute for Economic Research ===
The Department houses the Penn Institute for Economic Research (PIER). Founded in 1993 with a donation from William P. Carey, an American philanthropist and businessman, PIER conducts academic research and publishes a working paper series. Its former directors include Lawrence R. Klein, Antonio Merlo, and Enrique G. Mendoza.

=== Academic journals ===
The Department is the editorial home of the International Economic Review, one of the leading general audience journals in economics. It is also affiliated with Capitalism: A Journal of History and Economics.

=== Rankings ===
Penn Economics is currently ranked 10th in the United States by U.S. News & World Report, 10th in the world by The World University Rankings by the Times Higher Education, 8th in the world by the Academic Ranking of World Universities, 7th in the world by Tilburg University Economic Rankings, and 16th in the world by IDEAS.

== Notable alumni ==
- Ignazio Visco, Governor of the Bank of Italy
- Kim Choongsoo, Governor of the Bank of Korea
- Joaquin Vial, Board Member Central Bank of Chile
- Lars-Hendrik Röller, Germany's Chief Economic Adviser
- Ernesto J. Cordero, Mexico's Minister of Finance
- José Julián Sidaoui, Deputy Governor of the Bank of Mexico
- Jeffrey Harris, Professor at MIT
- Alfonso Prat Gay, former Governor of the Central Bank of Argentina
- Alassane Ouattara, President of Côte d'Ivoire (Ivory Coast)
- Morton O. Schapiro, President of Northwestern University
- Nariman Behravesh, President of Global Insight, the world's largest economics organization
- Winnie Monsod, former President of the Philippines National Economic and Development Authority
- Nancy Stokey, Frederick Henry Prince Distinguished Service Professor of Economics at the University of Chicago
- Edmond Villani, Director of Cohen & Steers, Inc.
- Marc Ivaldi, Member of the Toulouse School of Economics
- Gonzalo Garland, Executive Vice President of IE Foundation and professor at IE Business School
