= Meitzen =

Meitzen can be both a middle name and a surname. Notable people with the name include:

- Lee Meitzen Grue (1934–2021), American poet and teacher
- August Meitzen (1822–1910), German statistician
