= WKF =

WKF may refer to:

- WKF, the IATA code for Air Force Base Waterkloof, Gauteng, South Africa
- WKF, the National Rail code for Wakefield Westgate railway station, West Yorkshire, England
- World Karate Federation, the largest international governing body of sport karate with 198 member countries
- World Knowledge Forum, international non-governmental organization
