= Michio Morishima =

Japanese heterodox economist and public intellectual

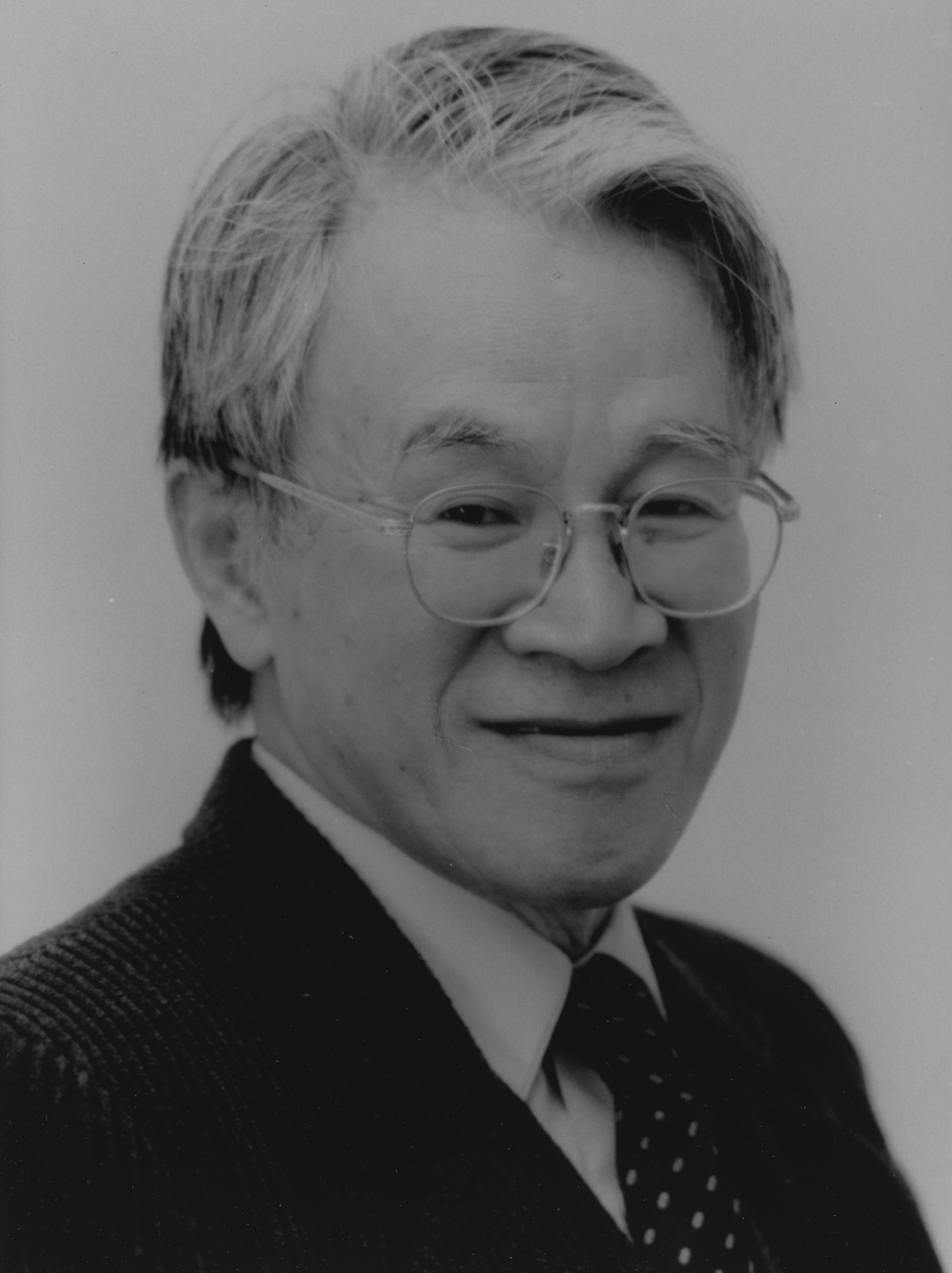
- Born: July 18, 1923; Osaka Prefecture
- Died: July 13, 2004 (aged 80)

Academic background
- Education: Kyoto University

Academic work
- Discipline: Heterodox economics
- Institutions: London School of Economics; Osaka University
- Doctoral students: Christopher A. Pissarides
- Awards: Order of Culture

Michio Morishima (森嶋 通夫, Morishima Michio; July 18, 1923 – July 13, 2004) was a Japanese heterodox economist and public intellectual who was the Sir John Hicks Professor of Economics at the London School of Economics from 1970 to 1988. He was also professor at Osaka University for many years, and a member of the British Academy. In 1976 he won the Order of Culture (文化勲章, Bunka-kunshō).

== Career ==
Michio Morishima had originally desired a career as a novelist, creating historical fiction. By the time he reached university, Morishima had decided instead to pursue an education in social science, studying both economics and sociology under Yasuma Takada at Kyoto University. Whilst attending university, Morishima was rigorously trained in both mainstream neoclassical economic theory and Marxian economics. Mathematically gifted, in 1946 he graduated from Kyoto University, and began to teach there in addition to at Osaka University. Morishima started the Institute of Social and Economic Research (ISER) of Osaka University with Yasuma Takada.

In 1960, Morishima established with Nobel-laureate Lawrence R. Klein, from the Economics Department of the University of Pennsylvania, the International Economic Review (nowadays published by the University of Pennsylvania, itself), which grew to become one of the leading journals in economics in the world.

In 1965, Morishima became the first Japanese president of the Econometric Society. By all accounts, British economist John Hicks was a committed advocate of Morishima's.

In 1968, Morishima emigrated from Japan to Britain, first teaching at University of Essex, then accepting an endowed chair at the LSE in 1970.

Later, Morishima started project which led to the establishment of the Suntory-Toyota Foundation and the Suntory and Toyota International Centres for Economic and Related Disciplines (STICERD) at LSE. Morishima was STICERD's first chairman. In 1991, he was electeMorishimaHonorary Fellow of the LSE.

== Contributions ==
Michio Morishima's three-volume work, which reinterpreted and synthesized the economic ideas of the major writings of David Ricardo, Karl Marx, and Léon Walras, represented one of the high points of the radical political economy of the 1970s New Left in North America. Moreshima's intense interest in general equilibrium theory, classical political economy, and capitalism drove this work. Based on LSE lectures, these books worked towards the accommodation of von Neumann's 1937 multi-sectoral growth model to a general equilibrium model. Considering the work of these theorists to be Ricardian, Morishima's trio of books attempted to show that the modification of them along von Neumann lines elucidated the theoretical similarities and differences between the three economists' positions.

== Academic positions ==
- 1948 – Assistant at Kyoto University
- 1950 – Lecturer at Kyoto University
- 1950 – Assistant professor at Kyoto University
- 1951 – Associate professor at Osaka University
- 1963 – Professor of Economics at Osaka University
- 1966 – Professor of ISER (Institute of Social and Economic *Research) at Osaka University
- 1968 – Visiting professor at University of Essex
- 1969 – Keynes visiting professor at University of Essex
- 1970 – Professor at London School of Economics
- 1982 – Sir John Hicks professor at London School of Economics

== Publications ==
- Morishima, Michio (1952), "On the Laws of Change of the Price System in an Economy which Contains Complementary Goods", Osaka EP.
- Morishima, Michio (1952), "Consumer Behavior and Liquidity Preference", Econometrica.
- Morishima, Michio (1956), "An Analysis of the Capitalist Process of Reproduction", Metroeconomica.
- Morishima, Michio (1957), "Notes on the Theory of Stability of Multiple Exchange", RES.
- Morishima, Michio (1958), "A Contribution to the Non-Linear Theory of the Trade Cycle", ZfN.
- Morishima, Michio (1958), "A Dynamic Analysis of Structural Change in a Leontief Model", Economica.
- Morishima, Michio (1958), "Prices Interest and Profits in a Dynamic Leontief System", Econometrica.
- Morishima, Michio (1959), "Some Properties of a Dynamic Leontief System with a Spectrum of Techniques", Econometrica.
- Morishima, Michio (1960), "Existence of Solution to the Walrasian System of Capital Formation and Credit", ZfN.
- Morishima, Michio (1960), "On the Three Hicksian Laws of Comparative Statics", RES.
- Morishima, Michio (1960), "A reconsideration of the Walras-Cassel-Leontief model of general equilibrium", in Arrow, Kenneth J.; Karlin, Samuel; Suppes, Patrick (eds.), Mathematical models in the social sciences, 1959: Proceedings of the first Stanford symposium, Stanford mathematical studies in the social sciences, IV, Stanford, California: Stanford University Press, pp. 63–76, ISBN 9780804700214
- Morishima, Michio (1960), "Economic Expansion and the Interest Rate in Generalized von Neumann Models", Econometrica.
- Morishima, Michio (1961), "Proof of a Turnpike Theorem: The `No Joint Production' Case", RES.
- Michio Morishima; Francis Seton (April 1961). "Aggregation in Leontief Matrices and the Labour Theory of Value". Econometrica. 29 (2): 203–220. doi:10.2307/1909289. JSTOR 1909289.
- Morishima, Michio (1961), "Generalizations of the Frobenius-Wielandt Theorems for Non- Negative Square Matrices", J of London Mathematical Society.
- Morishima, Michio (1962), "The Stability of Exchange Equilibrium: An alternative approach", IER.
- Morishima, Michio (1964), Equilibrium, Stability and Growth: A multi-sectoral analysis.
- Morishima, Michio (1966), "A Refutation of the Non-Switching Theorem", QJE.
- Morishima, Michio (1967), "A Few Suggestions on the Theory of Elasticity", Keizai Hyoron
- Morishima, Michio (1969), Theory of Economic Growth.
- Morishima, Michio (1970), "A Generalization of the Gross Substitute System", RES.
- Morishima, Michio (1971), "Consumption-Investment Frontier, Wage-Profit Frontier and the von Neumann Growth Equilibrium", ZfN.
- Morishima, Michio (1972), The Working of Econometric Models, (in collaboration with Y. Murata, T. Nosse and M. Saito).
- Morishima, Michio (1973), Marx's Economics: A dual theory of value and growth. Cambridge.
- Morishima, Michio (1973), Theory of Demand: Real and monetary, with co-authors.
- Morishima, Michio (1973), The Economic Theory of Modern Society.
- Morishima, Michio (1974), "The Frobenius Theorem, Its Solow-Samuelson Extension and the Kuhn-Tucker Theorem", with T. Fujimoto, JMathE.
- Michio Morishima (July 1974). "Marx in the Light of Modern Economic Theory". Econometrica. 42 (4): 611–632. doi:10.2307/1913933. JSTOR 1913933.
- Morishima, Michio (1977), Walras's Economics: A pure theory of capital and money.
- Michio Morishima; George Catephores (1978). Value, Exploitation, and Growth — Marx in the Light of Modern Economic Theory. London.
- Morishima, Michio (1978), "The Cournot-Walras Arbitrage Resource Consuming Exchange and Competitive Equilibrium", with M. Majumdar, in Hommage a Francois Perroux.
- Morishima, Michio (1982),Why Has Japan Succeeded? Western technology and the Japanese ethos.
- Morishima, Michio (1984), "The Good and Bad Uses of Mathematics", in Wiles and Routh, editors, Economics in Disarray.
- Morishima, Michio (1984), The Economics of Industrial Society.
- Morishima, Michio (1989), Ricardo's Economics.
- Morishima, Michio (1991), "General Equilibrium Theory in the 21st Century", EJ.
- Morishima, Michio (1992), Capital and Credit: A new formulation of general equilibrium theory.
- Morishima, Michio (1994), "Capital and Growth", in Homouda, The Legacy of Hicks.
- Morishima, Michio (1996), Dynamic Economic Theory.
- Morishima, Michio (1999), Why do I expect Japan to collapse? In Freedman, Craig, (ed.) Why Did Japan Stumble?: Causes and Cures. Edward Elgar, Cheltenham, UK, pp. 25–73. ISBN 9781858988344
