= Roland P. Falkner =

American economist and statistician

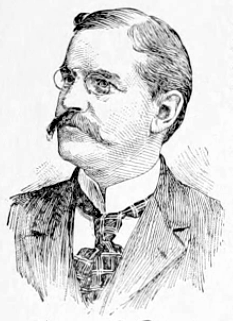
- Born: April 14, 1866; Bridgeport, Connecticut, United States
- Died: November 27, 1940 (aged 74); New York City
- Education: University of Pennsylvania
- Occupations: Economist, statistician

Roland Post Falkner (April 14, 1866 – November 27, 1940) was an American economist and statistician.

== Biography ==
Robert P. Falkner was born in Bridgeport, Connecticut on April 14, 1866.

He graduated from the University of Pennsylvania (Wharton School of Finance and Economy) in 1885; studied economics at Berlin, Leipzig and Halle-on-Saale, Germany; studied at the Collège de France; was instructor in accounting and statistics in the University of Pennsylvania in 1888–91, and professor of statistics 1891–1900.

He served also as statistician of the United States Senate Committee of Finance in 1891; as secretary of the United States delegation to the International Monetary Conference in Brussels; and as secretary of that conference in 1892. He left the University of Pennsylvania in 1900 for the Library of Congress, where he was chief of the division of documents. From 1904 to 1907 he served as commissioner of education in Puerto Rico; from 1908 to 1911 he was statistician in charge of school inquiries for the United States Immigration Commission, and in 1911-12 was assistant director of the census. From 1915 until 1926 he was associated with the Alexander Hamilton Institute, and from 1926 onward with the National Industrial Conference Board.

In 1894 he was elected to the International Institute of Statistics. In 1920 he was elected as a Fellow of the American Statistical Association.

He died at Memorial Hospital in New York on November 27, 1940.

== Works ==
He is author of numerous essays on criminology, sociology, etc. to economic, statistical and other journals; and was editor of Annals of the American Academy of Political and Social Science 1890–1900. He did a notable study of prices and wages in the United States for the United States Senate. It was published as "Retail Prices and Wages" (1892) and "Wholesale Prices, Wages, and Transportation" (1893). He published a translation of August Meitzen's History, Theory, and Technique of Statistics (1893).
