= University of Pennsylvania College of Arts and Sciences =

Liberal arts school of University of Pennsylvania

Coordinates: 39.95°N 75.19°W

- Type: Private undergraduate college
- Established: 1740; 286 years ago
- Parent institution: University of Pennsylvania School of Arts and Sciences
- Dean: Peter Struck
- Undergraduates: 6,400 (Fall 2018)
- Location: Philadelphia, Pennsylvania, United States
- Website: college.upenn.edu

The University of Pennsylvania College of Arts and Sciences (CAS) is the undergraduate college within the School of Arts and Sciences at the University of Pennsylvania. It is situated on the university's main campus in University City, Philadelphia.

The college traces its roots to the establishment of a secondary school known as Unnamed Charity School in 1740. In 1749, Benjamin Franklin and twenty-one leading citizens of Philadelphia officially founded a secondary school named the Academy of Philadelphia. In 1755, the secondary school was expanded to include a collegiate division known as the College of Philadelphia. The secondary and collegiate institutions were known collectively as The Academy and College of Philadelphia. The college received its charter from Thomas Penn and Richard Penn. Penn CAS is the oldest institution of higher learning in the state of Pennsylvania and the sixth-oldest chartered college in the United States.

== History ==
The College of Arts and Sciences was preceded by two schools, the Charity School and the Academy of Philadelphia. Initially organized by the founder of Methodism, George Whitefield, as "Charity School," a secondary school known as "Academy of Philadelphia" was eventually founded by Benjamin Franklin in 1749, and was expanded to include a collegiate division known as "College of Philadelphia" in 1755 when it obtained a charter from Thomas Penn and Richard Penn in 1755. Due in part to the influence of early Methodism's religious leaders, the college was based in George Whitfield's "New Building", on Ninth Street in Center City, Philadelphia.

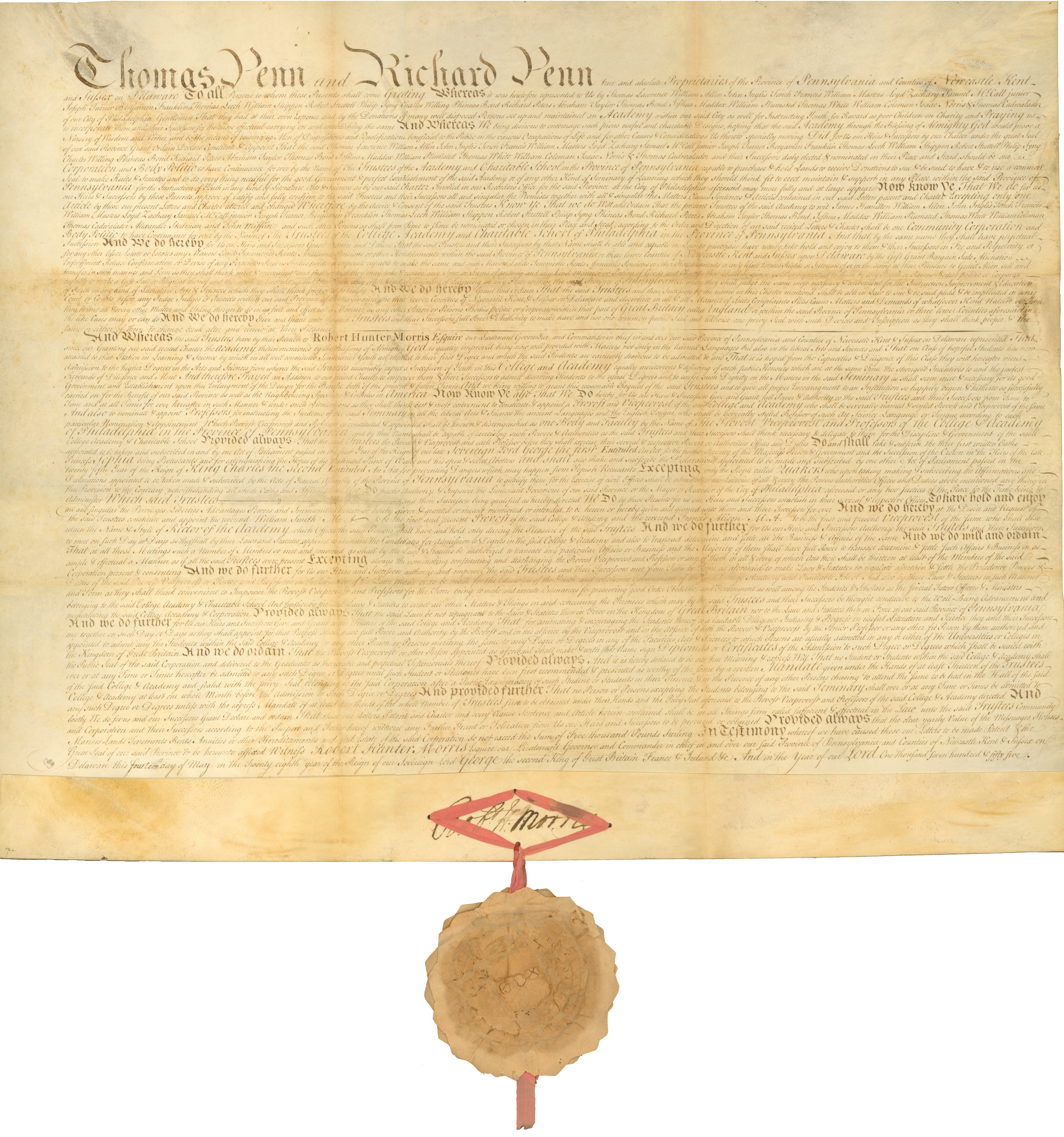
Charter of the College of Philadelphia (University of Pennsylvania) in 1755

Benjamin Franklin served as the institution's first president until 1755, and continued to serve as a trustee until his death in 1790. Unlike other Colonial American colleges at the time, which educated young men for the Christian Ministry, the college was innovative in that it was founded as a nonsectarian institution meant to train students for leadership in business, government and public service. However, Penn's first Provost, William Smith, turned the curriculum back to religious channels after succeeding Franklin. The first class graduated in 1757.

In 1765, John Morgan, a graduate of the Class of 1757, established a medical college at the school, now known as the Perelman School of Medicine, which was the first medical school in the United States.

President's House on Ninth Street

By the beginning of the American Revolutionary War, the college had already educated some of the nation's foremost political leaders, including James Wilson, Founding Father and the first Associate Justice of the Supreme Court of the United States; Francis Hopkinson, Founding Father and the first judge of the United States District Court for the Eastern District of Pennsylvania under General George Washington; and Hugh Williamson, Founding Father, and author of several of the Letters of Sylvia.

With the successful Treaty of Paris in 1783, the domestic situation was stable enough for the college to resume classes. The college was briefly chartered as a state institution and earned its current name, the University of Pennsylvania, when the university was made private in 1791.

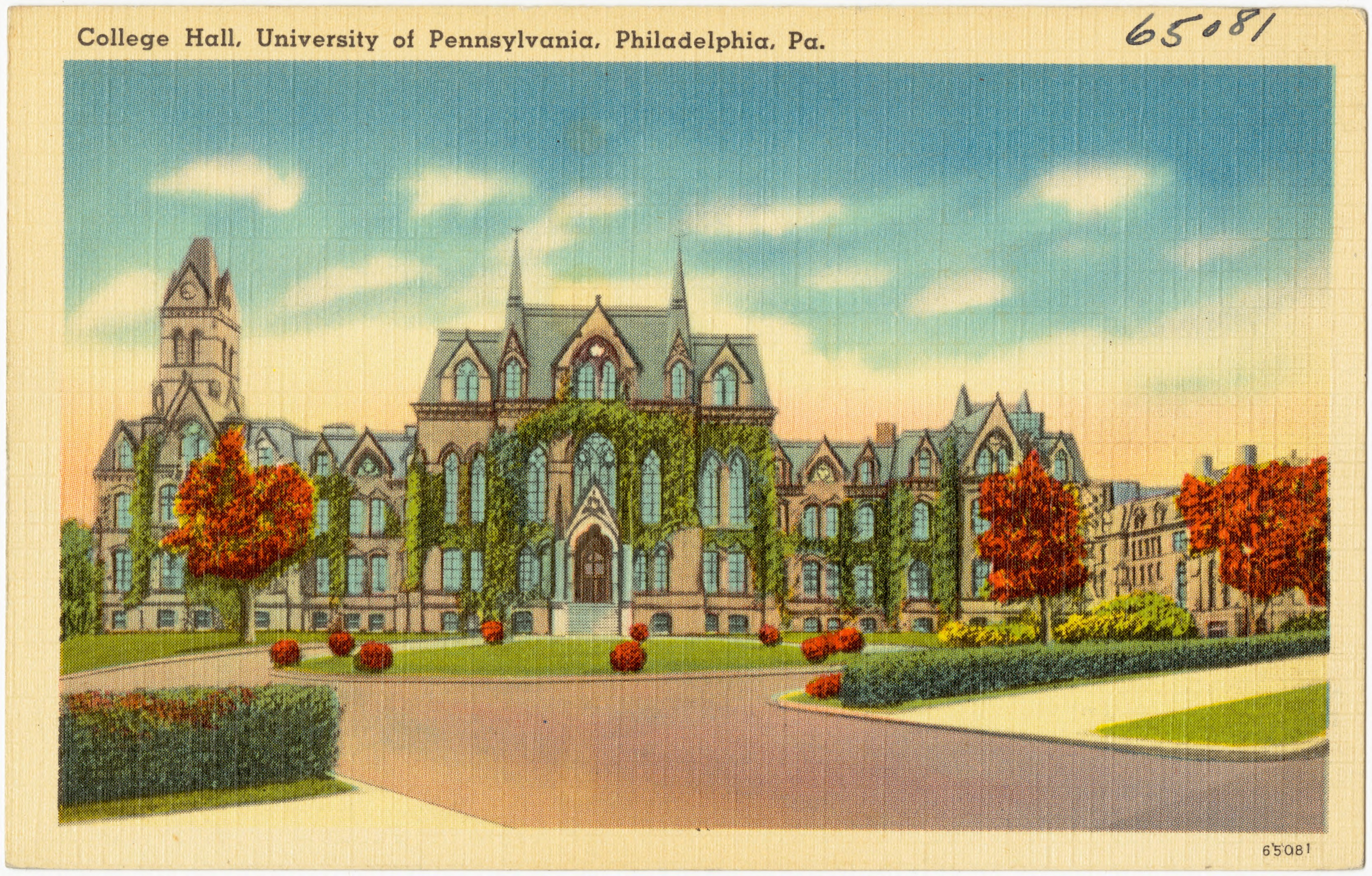
College Hall c.1930

Having been home to the Continental Congress in College Hall since 1778, the college moved to the President's House on Ninth and Chestnut Streets in 1802.

Under the leadership of Provost Charles Janeway Stille in 1872, Penn relocated a second time to Almshouse farm west of Philadelphia's Schuylkill River, its present site. Over the next two decades, the university began re-orienteering itself to Benjamin Franklin's original aims of discovery and invention, with the Graduate School of Arts and Sciences being founded in 1882, and the first Ph.D. in Physics award in 1889 under the provostship of William Pepper.

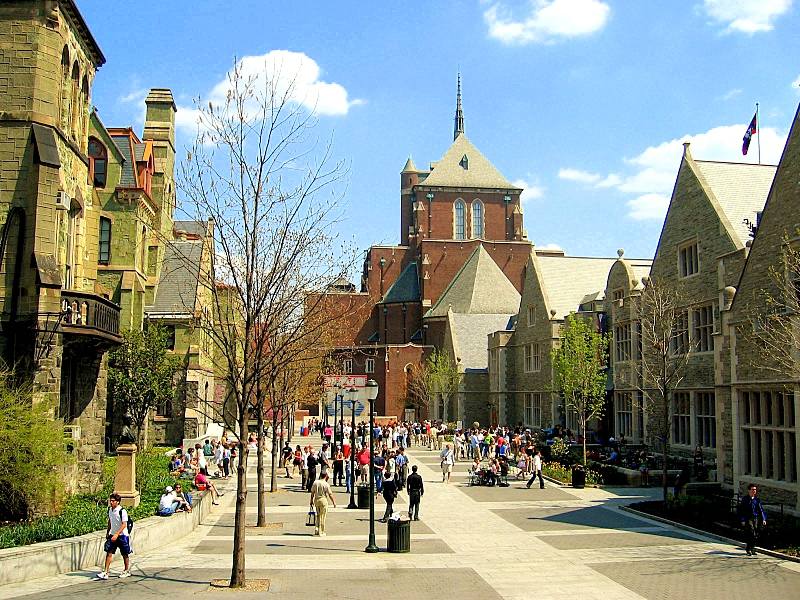
Penn Commons

Transforming itself into a modern research institution, the university established a number of professional schools, including the Law School in 1850, the School of Engineering and Applied Sciences in 1852, and the School of Dentistry in 1878. The world's first, collegiate school of business, the Wharton School was founded in 1881 by an endowment from Joseph Wharton. The School of Veterinary Medicine and the School of Design were subsequently founded in 1884 and 1890, respectively.

Penn was also a leader in educational accessibility, and embraced the diversity of America during this period. Among the Ivy League Universities, it was one of the first to admit students of color in 1879. Women were admitted to the graduate school since 1882, and the first women undergraduates at Penn were enrolled with the establishment of the School of Education in 1914.

== Academics ==
=== Curriculum ===
The College of Arts and Sciences is known for its rigorous liberal arts curriculum, a series of mandatory classes and distribution requirements that form the heart of the college students' academic experience. The General Education Curriculum is based on the following:

Course	Semesters Required
Foundational Approach - Writing; A year-long intensive seminar that develops students' writing skills, taken in the freshman year.	1
Foundational Approach - Foreign Language; A distribution requirement intended to instill at least an intermediate level of a foreign language.	4
Foundational Approach - Quantitative Data Analysis; A course in mathematical or statistical analysis of quantitative data.	1
Foundational Approach - Formal Reasoning and Analysis; A course that focuses on deductive reasoning and the formal structure of human thought.	1
Foundational Approach - Cross-Cultural Analysis; A course that inculcates in the students the ability to understand and interpret the cultures of peoples with histories different from their own.	1
Foundational Approach - Cultural Diversity in the U.S. A course that develops students' ability to examine issue of diversity with a focus on race, ethnicity, gender, sexuality, class and religion.	1
Sector of Knowledge - I. Society; A distributional requirement designed to instill structure and norms of contemporary human society.	1
Sector of Knowledge - II. History and Tradition; A distribution requirement focusing on studies of continuity and change in human thought, belief and action.	1
Sector of Knowledge - III. Arts and Letters; A distribution requirement encompassing the means and meaning of visual arts, literature and music.	1
Sector of Knowledge - IV. Humanities and Social Sciences; A distribution requirement combining methods and approaches of works in the humanities and the social sciences.	1
Sector of Knowledge - V. Living World; A distribution requirement dealing with the evolution, development, structure and function of living systems.	1
Sector of Knowledge - VI. Physical World; A distribution requirement focusing on the methodology and concepts of physical science.	1
Sector of Knowledge - VII. Natural Sciences and Mathematics; A distributional requirement focusing on diverse approaches to the natural sciences and mathematics.	1

The foreign language requirement, however, may be skipped if the student passes a placement exam or demonstrates an acceptance standard of proficiency. Most students graduate within four years with a Bachelor of Arts degree, although 20% of students enroll in one of Penn's most selective dual degree programs with The Wharton School (B.A - B.S. in economics), Penn Law (B.A. - J.D.), The School of Nursing (B.A. - B.S.N.) or the Engineering School (B.A. - B.S.).

== Campus ==
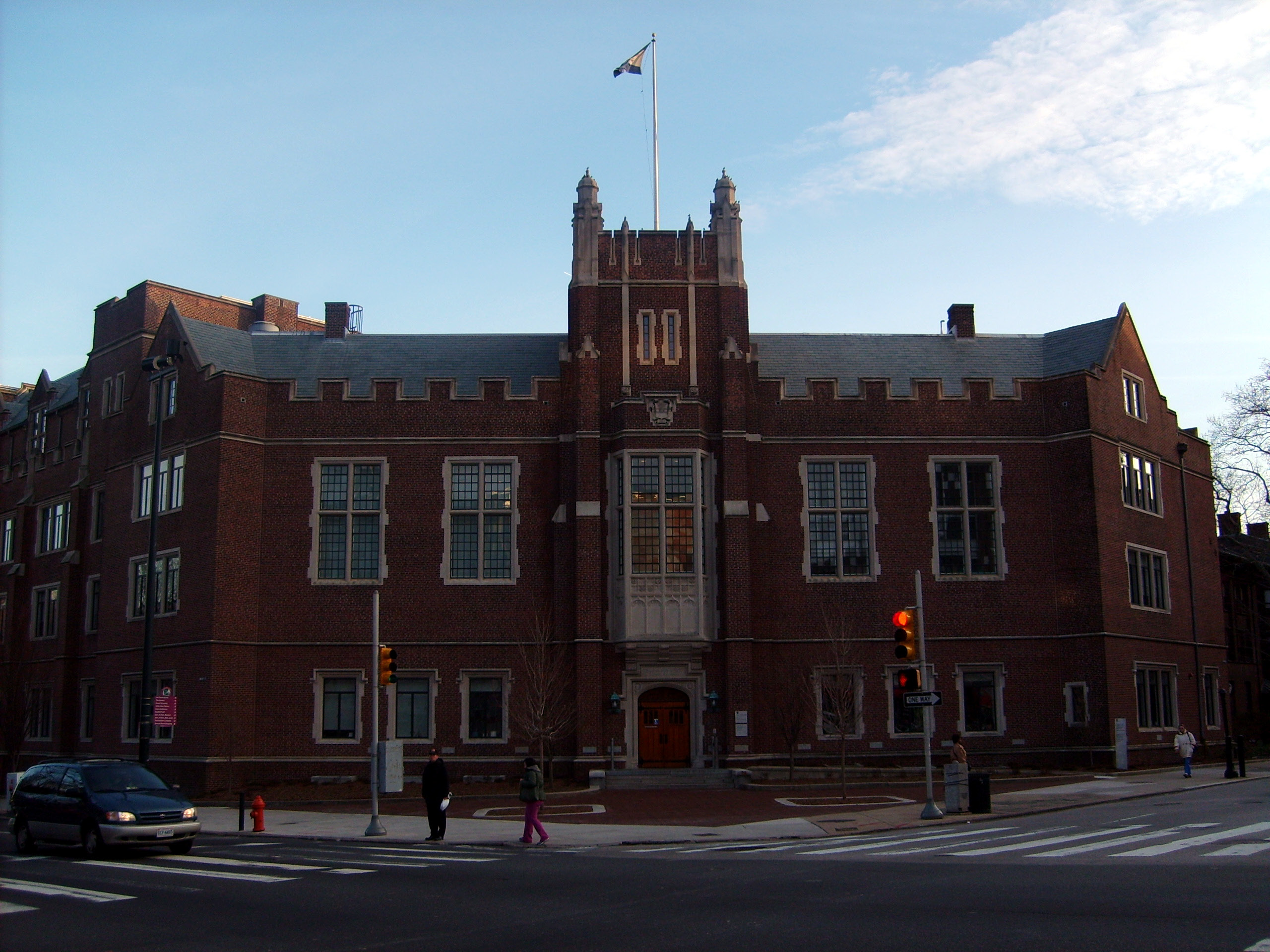
Fisher-Bennett Hall, home to the faculties of English, Music and Cinema Studies

The college's facilities are located on the University of Pennsylvania's University City campus, especially in College Hall, which houses its administrative and admissions offices.

Van Pelt Library, the University of Pennsylvania's main library, is home to more than 2,481,000 volumes, 13,000 current serial subscriptions, and approximately 1.5 million microforms. The collection of the University of Pennsylvania Library System consists of more than 6.19 million volumes held in 15 specialized libraries as well as a digital library.

Students at the Penn College of Arts and Sciences are guaranteed campus housing for four years. Residence halls, which also house undergraduate students of Penn's Wharton School, Nursing School and Engineering School are either located on the University City Campus. Freshmen are housed on the historic main quad, which was built in 1894.

All first-year students, including transfer students, are required to enroll in a residential dining plan, which offers all-you-can-eat meals in Penn's five dining halls: the 1920 Commons, Hill House Commons, English House Commons, Mcclelland Express, and New College House Commons.

== Governance ==
The college is a school within the Penn School of Arts & Sciences (SAS). Professor Steven J. Fluharty is the Dean of the School since July 2013 and was reappointed for a second term which he will serve until 2025. Professor Dennis DeTurck stepped down as Dean of the College of Arts and Sciences in Fall 2017 and was succeeded by Professor Paul D. Sniegowski. After Professor Sniegowski moved to become the President of Earlham College in August 2024, Professor Peter Struck became the new Dean. The college student body elects representatives to the undergraduate council, which comprises members from each of the four undergraduate schools at the University of Pennsylvania.

== Noted people ==
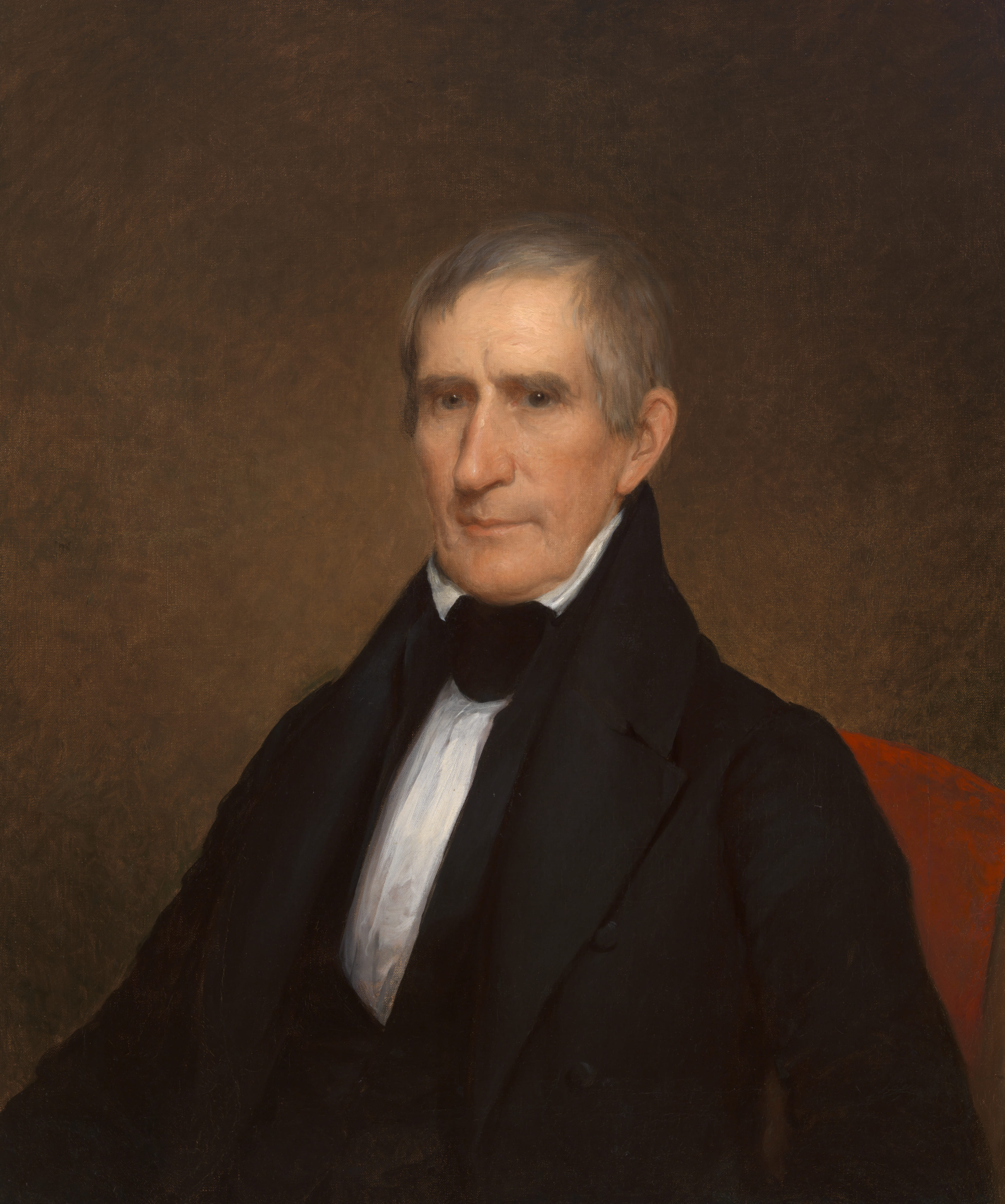
William Henry Harrison

Notable people who have attended or taught at the College of Arts and Sciences or the academy and College of Philadelphia, its predecessor, include Founding Fathers of the United States Benjamin Franklin, James Wilson, Benjamin Rush, George Clymer, Robert Morris, Francis Hopkinson and Thomas McKean. Other important figures include Presidents William Henry Harrison and Donald Trump, Supreme Court Justice Owen Roberts, Academy Award Winner John Legend, NBC News Chief Foreign Affairs Correspondent Andrea Mitchell and Elon Musk.
