= Chang Dae-whan =

South Korean businessman

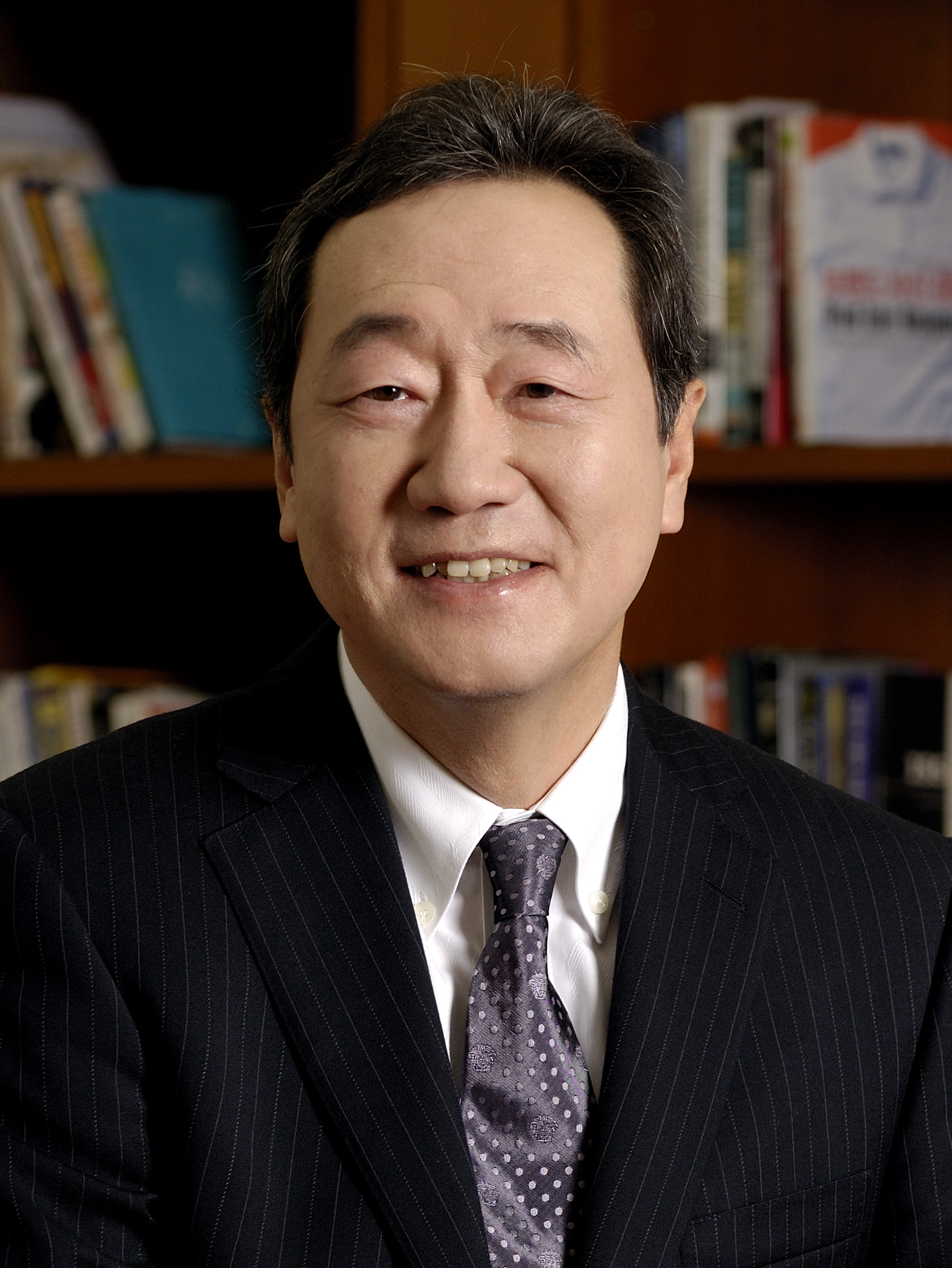

Acting Prime Minister of South Korea
- In office 9 August 2002 – 28 August 2002
- President: Kim Dae-jung
- Preceded by: Jeon Yun-churl (acting)
- Succeeded by: Kim Suk-soo

Personal details
- Born: 21 March 1952 (age 74)
- Party: Independent
- Children: 2
- Education: University of Rochester (BA); George Washington University (MA); New York University (MA, PhD)
- Occupation: Businessman; President of the Maeil Business Newspaper

Korean name
- Hangul: 장대환
- Hanja: 張大煥
- RR: Jang Daehwan
- MR: Chang Taehwan

Chang Dae-whan (Korean: 장대환; also known as Chang Dae-hwan, born 21 March 1952) is a South Korean businessman. He is best known as the president of the Maeil Business Newspaper, South Korea's main business daily. He is the founder of the World Knowledge Forum. The World Knowledge Forum is the largest forum of its kind in Asia. He also served for a brief time as South Korea's acting prime minister in August 2002 under president Kim Dae-jung, but the National Assembly voted not to confirm him.

== Education and career ==
Chang obtained a bachelor's degree in politics at the University of Rochester in 1974. He also received a diploma for the Study of EC (European Community) in Belgium in June 1975, and went on to do an M.A in 1976. in international affairs at George Washington University's Elliott School of International Affairs. Afterwards, Chang received his M.A. and Ph.D. in economics and management from New York University, where he wrote his 1987 doctoral dissertation on South Korean construction firms in the Middle East. He serves as the president of the South Korean branch of the NYU alumni association.

Chang started his newspaper career as a manager of planning department at Maeil Business Newspaper on 1 January 1986. He then rose to the position of director, managing director, and executive director successively, finally becoming the president and publisher in 1988.

Chang is a Commissioner for the Global Commission on Internet Governance.

== As prime minister ==
Chang was named as South Korea's acting PM on 9 August 2002, after the National Assembly declined to confirm his predecessor Chang Sang. The nomination was a surprise to fellow top-level civil servants in their 60s, as Chang was just 50 years old at the time, and had no experience in government. If appointed, he would have been the wealthiest member of the cabinet, with ₩5.6 billion in family assets, according to his self-report. However, during his confirmation hearings, Grand National Party (GNP) members including Hong Joon-pyo and Ahn Kyung-ryul expressed their opposition. Chang himself also acknowledged in a press conference that he had falsely registered himself as living in Seoul's Gangnam District to enroll his son in a better school. In the end he was rejected by a vote of 151-112.

== Personal life ==
He was married and has two children.
