= International Economic Review =

- Discipline: Economics
- Language: English
- Edited by: Dirk Krueger

Publication details
- History: 1960–present
- Publisher: Wiley-Blackwell for the Economics Department of the University of Pennsylvania and Osaka University (United States)
- Frequency: Quarterly
- Impact factor: 1.210 (2014)

Standard abbreviations
- ISO 4: Int. Econ. Rev.
- NLM: Int Econ Rev (Philadelphia)

Indexing
- ISSN: 0020-6598
- LCCN: 2001-227188
- JSTOR: 00206598
- OCLC no.: 47074602

Links
- Journal homepage; Online access; Online archive

The International Economic Review (IER) is a quarterly peer-reviewed scientific journal in economics published by the Economics Department of the University of Pennsylvania and Osaka University. The journal's focus is wide and includes many areas of economics, including econometrics, economic theory, macroeconomics, and applied economics.

IER was started in 1960 by Michio Morishima, at Osaka University's Institute of Social Economic Research (ISER), and Lawrence R. Klein, at the University of Pennsylvania's Wharton School and Department of Economics. The Kansai Economic Federation of Osaka materially and financially supported the IER at its initial stages. In the present, the IER is run as a non-profit joint academic venture between ISER and the Department of Economics at the University of Pennsylvania.

The journal is currently edited by Dirk Krueger of the Pennsylvania Editorial Office and co-edited by Masaki Aoyagi of the Osaka Editorial Office.

It is considered one of the leading journals in economics in the world.

== Lawrence Klein Lecture ==
In 1997, IER started the annual Lawrence Klein Lecture series which are later published in the IER. Past speakers included John A. List (2017), Richard Blundell (2016), Stephen Morris (2015), Alvin E. Roth (2014, Nobel laureate, 2012), Ariél Pakes (2013), Boyan Jovanovic (2012), Ernst Fehr (2011), Christopher A. Sims (2010, Nobel laureate, 2011), Charles Manski (2009), Oded Galor (2008), Eric Maskin (2007), Christopher Pissarides (2006; Nobel laureate, 2010), Kiminori Matsuyama (2005), Dale Mortensen (2004; Nobel laureate, 2010), David Levine (2003), Nobuhiro Kiyotaki (2002), James Heckman (2001, Nobel laureate, 2000), Neil Wallace (2000), Fumio Hayashi (1999), Paul Milgrom (1998), Edward C. Prescott (1997, Nobel laureate, 2004).

== Abstracting and indexing ==
According to the Journal Citation Reports, the journal has a 2014 impact factor of 1.210, ranking it 108th out of 333 journals in the category "Economics".

== See also ==
- List of economics journals
