= Power theory of economics =

Developed by Yasuma Takada in a series of lectures at Kyoto University, the power theory of economics is mostly based on a critique of both mainstream economics as well as heterodox economics theories of unemployment, most notably Keynesian economics and Marxian economics. The theory accommodates Thorstein Veblen, Vilfredo Pareto and Joseph Schumpeter.

Takada sometimes referred to the theory as a second order approximation, as introducing a theory of power relations into the materialism of economics was seen as one step closer to a true picture of socio-economic relationships.

== Sources ==
Power Theory of Economics by Takata, Yasuma ISBN 0-333-57533-4 PALGRAVE MACMILLAN, 1995
