= Berlin Global Dialogue =

Annual conference series

- Founded: 2022 (informally, first held in September 2023)
- Founder: Lars-Hendrik Röller
- Type: Non-profit organization
- Headquarters: Berlin, Germany
- Key people: Lars-Hendrik Röller (Leader)

The Berlin Global Dialogue is an annual conference organized in Berlin by a non-profit organization of the same name, led by economist Lars-Hendrik Röller.

== Overview ==
Röller founded the Berlin Global Dialogue (BGD) shortly after leaving in 2022 his position of economic advisor to the Chancellor of Germany, which he had held for more than a decade under chancellor Angela Merkel. The BGD is hosted by the European School of Management and Technology, of which Röller had been president from 2006 to 2011. It was first held in September 2023.

The BGD is a high-level event that ambitions to bring together leaders from the public and private sector across the world's regions. Notable participants in 2023 and 2024 have included Saudi Economics Minister Faisal F. Alibrahim, French President Emmanuel Macron, German Chancellor Olaf Scholz, and Turkish Finance Minister Mehmet Şimşek.

2025 it will take place from October 23 to October 25.

== See also ==
- Boao Forum for Asia
- World Economic Forum
- World Knowledge Forum
