= Derek F. Abell =

American academic

- Born: 1938 (age 87–88)
- Education: University of Southampton; Massachusetts Institute of Technology; Harvard
- Occupations: Professor Emeritus, International Dean
- Notable work: Three Dimensional Business Definition model

Derek F. Abell (born 1938) is the founding president and Professor Emeritus at the European School of Management and Technology (ESMT) in Berlin. In 2012, he also became the international dean at HSM Educação in Sao Paulo, Brazil. He is a published author of books and academic journal articles, mostly in the fields of strategic marketing, general management, leadership, and executive responsibilities. One of his most significant contributions has been the creation of the Three Dimensional Business Definition Model.

== Early life and education ==
He obtained a bachelor's degree in aeronautical engineering from the University of Southampton in 1960. After that he moved to the United States and obtained his master's degree in industrial management from the MIT Sloan School of Management in 1966, and his doctorate in business administration from Harvard Business School in 1970.

== Career ==
After obtaining his doctorate, Abell served as a full-time faculty member at the Harvard Business School, until 1981. He became a professor of strategy and marketing at the International Institute for Management Development (IMD) in Lausanne, Switzerland from 1981 to 2003. During that same time, he also served as dean of IMD's institutional predecessor, Institut pour l'Etude des Methodes de Direction de l'Entreprise (IMEDE), from 1981 to 1989, and as professor of technology and management at the Swiss Federal Institutes of Technology (at both the Zurich campus and Lausanne campus) from 1994 to 2003.

== Three Dimensional Business Definition model ==
The Three Dimensional Business Definition model (or Abell model) helps a company define its business. Prior to Abell’s model, it was common to define a business either through its resource capabilities or its programs of activity, such as with a product/market grid. According to his book, Defining the Business, Abell suggests the previous two-dimensional definitions were insufficient, and instead created a three-dimensional analysis. The three dimensions in Abell's model are:

- Served Customer Groups (who are the customers)
- Served Customer Functions (what are the customers' needs)
- Technologies Utilized (how are needs being satisfied)

== Bibliography ==
Books:

- Managing with dual strategies: Mastering the present, preempting the future. Free Press, 1993.
- Dynamic entrepreneurship in Central and Eastern Europe. Delwel, 1993. Coauthored with Thomas Köllermeier.
- Defining the business: The starting point of strategic planning. Prentice Hall, 1980.
- Strategic market planning: Problems and analytical approaches. Prentice Hall, 1979. Coauthored with John S. Hammond.
- Competitive market strategies: Some generalizations and hypotheses. Marketing Science Institute, 1975.

Book Chapters:

- Putting shareholder value in the right perspective. Chapter 9 in Organization 21C: Someday all organizations will lead this way, ed. Subir Chowdhury. Prentice Hall, 2003.
- Reinventing the Management Education Industry – A Revolution in the Making. Chapter 3.2 in Business Excellence in technologieorientierten Unternehmen. Friedrik Hacklin, Christian Marxt. Springer, Berlin, Heidelberg, 2008.

Journal Articles:

- The future of strategy is leadership. (2006), Journal of Business Research, 59(3): 310–314.
- Leadership education as a moving target. (2005), International Journal of Leadership Education 1(1): 1–8.
- Competing today while preparing for tomorrow. (1999), Sloan Management Review, 40(3): 73–81.
- Strategic windows. (1978), Journal of Marketing, 42(3): 21–26.
- The Past, Present, and Future of Strategy: Broadening Challenges; Advancing Insight. (2015), Iberoamerican Journal Of Strategic Management (IJSM), 13(3), 07-18.
