= University of Pennsylvania School of Arts and Sciences =

Liberal arts school of the University of Pennsylvania

- Motto: Leges sine moribus vanae
- Motto in English: Laws without morals are in vain
- Type: Private
- Established: 1755
- Parent institution: University of Pennsylvania
- President: J. Larry Jameson
- Dean: Mark Trodden
- College Dean: Peter Struck
- Undergraduates: 6400
- Location: Philadelphia, Pennsylvania, 19104, U.S. 39.9558°N 75.1946°W
- Campus: Urban
- Website: www.sas.upenn.edu

The University of Pennsylvania School of Arts & Sciences (SAS) is a school at the University of Pennsylvania. It includes three affiliated units: the College of Arts and Sciences, the Graduate Division, and the College of Liberal and Professional Studies.

Formerly known as the Faculty of Arts and Sciences, SAS is divided into three main academic components: The College of Arts and Sciences (CAS) is Penn's undergraduate liberal arts school. The Graduate Division offers post-undergraduate M.A., M.S., and Ph.D. programs. The College of Liberal and Professional Studies (LPS), originally called the College of General Studies, is Penn's professional education division catering to working professionals.

Mark Trodden, Thomas S. Gates Jr. Professor of Physics and Astronomy, is Dean of the School of Arts & Sciences, a position he assumed in June 2025.

== History ==
The School’s early history is intertwined with the first years of the University of Pennsylvania, which was established in 1740. Building on founder Benjamin Franklin’s vision of combining a traditional and practical education, the College of Arts and Sciences was the first colonial institution to teach the sciences, government and commerce, as well as classical subjects such as Latin, literature and philosophy.

A graduate division was established in 1882 with the appointment of a Faculty of Philosophy. The first fellowship for graduate study was established in 1885, and the first earned Ph.D. was awarded in physics in 1889. In 1892, the University began offering college courses for teachers, establishing the precursor of today’s College of Liberal and Professional Studies, the Ivy League’s oldest continuing education program.

In 1933, the College of Liberal Arts for Women was established, offering women a full-time, four-year undergraduate degree program in the liberal arts. In 1974, the College, the College for Women, the College of Liberal and Professional Studies, and the social science department of the Wharton School combined to become the Faculty of Arts and Sciences, which was soon after renamed the School of Arts & Sciences.

== Departments ==
The School of Arts & Sciences contains the following departments:

- Africana Studies
- Anthropology
- Biology
- Chemistry
- Cinema and Media Studies
- Classical Studies
- Criminology
- Earth and Environmental Science
- East Asian Languages & Civilizations
- Economics
- English
- Francophone, Italian and Germanic Studies
- History
- History and Sociology of Science
- History of Art
- Linguistics
- Mathematics
- Middle Eastern Languages & Cultures
- Music
- Philosophy
- Physics and Astronomy
- Political Science
- Psychology
- Religious Studies
- Russian and East European Studies
- Sociology
- South Asia Studies
- Spanish and Portuguese

== See also ==
- Henry Lamar Crosby
- Herman Vandenburg Ames
- University of Pennsylvania Economics Department
