= Francis Seton =

Austrian born British economist (1920 – 2020)

Francis Seton (1920–2002) (born as Franz Szedo) was an Austrian born British economist who studied and then worked at the University of Oxford. His areas of research included the economy of the USSR, the tendency of the rate of profit to fall. Input-Output analysis, prices of production and ideal pricing (eigenprices) systems.

== Selected publications ==
- Seton, F. (1957). The “transformation problem”. The Review of Economic Studies, 24(3), 149–160.
- Morishima, M., & Seton, F. (1961). Aggregation in Leontief matrices and the labour theory of value. Econometrica: Journal of The Econometric Society, 203–220.
- Seton, F., (1985). The economics of cost, use, and value: the evaluation of performance, structure, and prices across time, space, and economic systems. Oxford: Clarendon Press. Reissued as Seton, Francis. (1992). The Economics of Cost Use and Value : The Evaluation of Performance Structure and Prices Across Time Space and Economic Systems. Rev. and Expanded with Jan Tinbergen and Albert E. Steenge ed. Oxford England Oxford: Clarendon Press ; Oxford University Press.
