= European School of Management and Technology =

Private business school in Berlin, Germany

ESMT Berlin
- Type: Private non-profit
- Established: 2002
- Affiliations: AMBA; EQUIS; AACSB; FIBAA; Wissenschaftsrat; Triple accreditation
- Endowment: €124 million (as of February 2024)
- President: Jörg Rocholl
- Faculty: 49 members from 18 nations (as of November 2026)
- Students: 1100+ (cumulative in 2025)
- Location: Schlossplatz 1, 10178, Berlin, Germany; 52°30′56.5″N 13°24′05.3″E
- Website: esmt.berlin

The European School of Management and Technology, also known as ESMT Berlin, is a private non-profit business school based in Berlin, Germany. The business school was founded in 2002 by 25 companies and institutions and offers a range of MBAs, master's degrees, and other degree and executive education programs.

ESMT Berlin is regarded as one of the most prestigious business schools in Europe. It is one of four business schools in Germany with triple accreditation from EQUIS, AACSB, and AMBA. The owner of the business school is the ESMT European School of Management and Technology GmbH (ESMT GmbH), which is recognized as a non-profit organization.

== History ==
ESMT Berlin was founded on October 31, 2002, by 25 multinational corporations seeking to break from the traditional approaches of German executive education by creating a more international business school in Germany.

The founding companies invested approximately 65 million euros into the ESMT foundation, which owns the school. In October 2003, ESMT Berlin was granted permission from the Senate of Berlin to operate as a private university. Initially, programs were held in Munich, while the ESMT campus in Berlin was under construction until 2006.

In December 2006, the first students at the business school received their degrees. Following financial problems, a further 60 million euros was invested in ESMT Berlin's endowment fund in 2010. Since then, the university has been fully financed.

In December 2013, the state of Berlin authorized ESMT Berlin to award doctorates for five years, while extending ESMT's status as a private university for an additional ten years. Since 2008, the university has been participating in the Berlin Doctoral Program in Economics and Management Science (BDPEMS), which merged into the Berlin School of Economics in 2019.

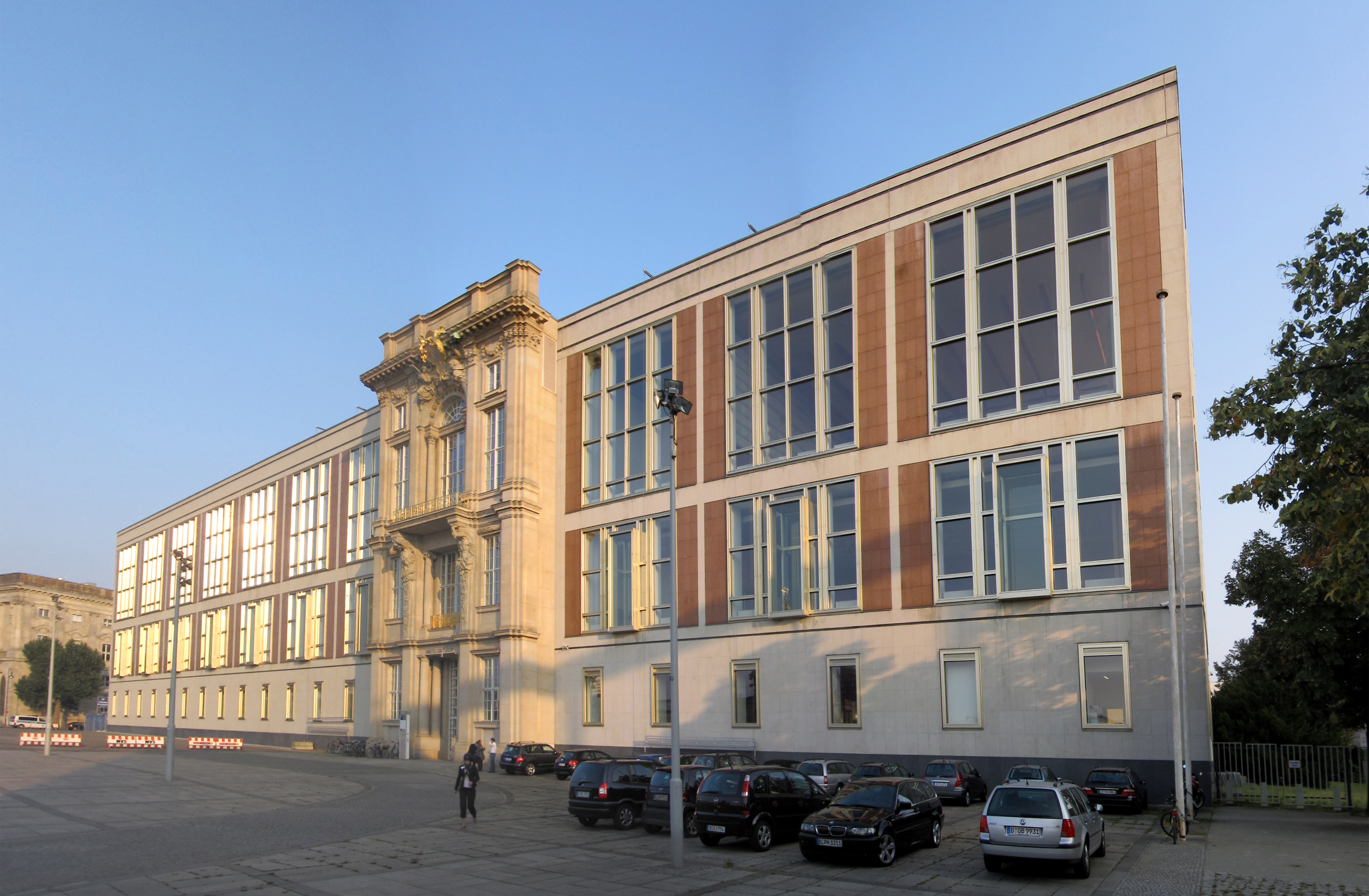
Berlin campus

Besides the main campus in Berlin, the school operated a campus Cologne, Schloss Gracht, until 2018. The historic castle and grounds, which served as the Metternich family's residence for centuries, became the site of ESMT's German-language executive education courses right after the school's foundation. Following integration of these courses into the main campus of ESMT, Schloss Gracht was sold in 2018.

In 2022, the foundation assets amounted to around 123 million euros. In early 2024, over 1,000 students were enrolled, and 45 faculty members were employed at ESMT.

== Organisation ==
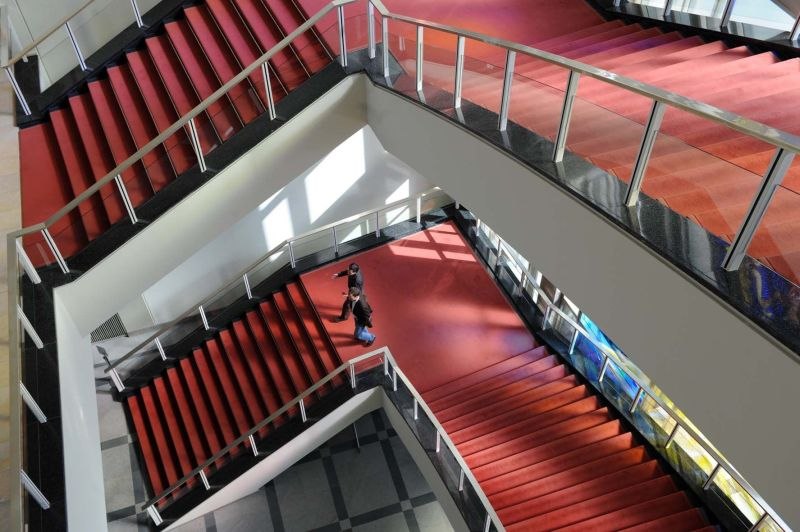
Entrance Hall Staircase at the State Council Building

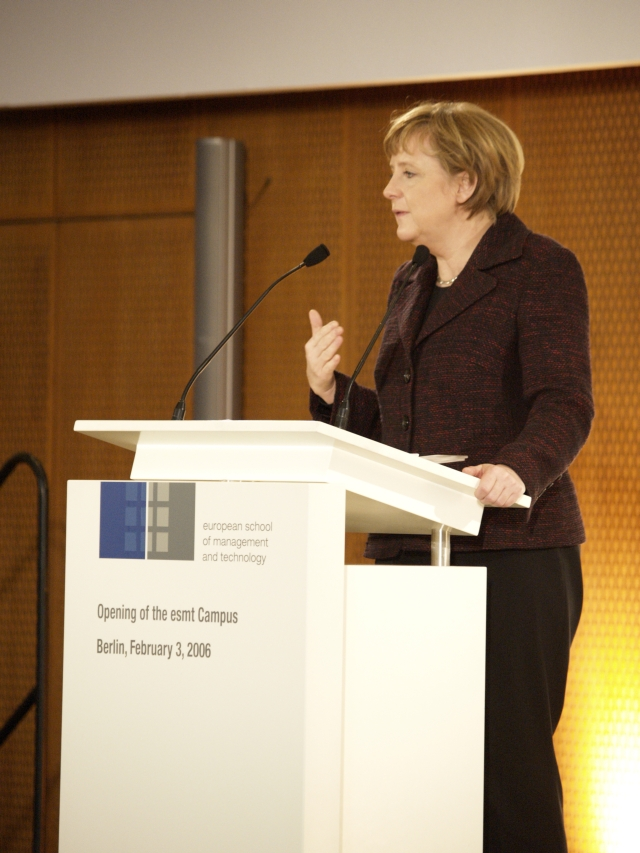
Federal Chancellor Angela Merkel giving a keynote speech at ESMT Berlin (2006)

The school focuses on management, analytics, and innovation and is a state-accredited university. ESMT has a branch office in Shanghai. The school has more than 8,000 alumni in chapters located worldwide and around 3,500 executives and managers participate in the ESMT Executive Development Programs each year.

The main governance structures are the Executive Management Committee, chaired by Jörg Rocholl, PhD, President and Managing Director of ESMT Berlin, and the Supervisory Board of ESMT GmbH chaired by Werner Zedelius, Senior Advisor at Allianz SE. Former presidents before Rocholl were Derek F. Abell (until 2006) and Lars-Hendrik Röller (from 2006 to 2011). The Board of Trustees of the ESMT Foundation consists of Chairman Ola Källenius and Deputy Chairman Christian Sewing.

Centers and institutes

- DEEP – Institute for Deep Tech Innovation
- ESMT Institute for Sustainable Transformation
- Hidden Champions Institute (HCI)
- Bringing Technology To Market Center (BTM)

Chairs

- Deutsche Bank Professor in Sustainable Finance
- Deutsche Post DHL Group Professor in Sustainable Accounting
- Deutsche Telekom Chair in Leadership and HR Development
- Ingrid and Manfred Gentz Chair in Business and Society
- Joachim Faber Chair in Business and Technology
- Lufthansa Group Chair in Innovation
- MCC Professor in Strategy
- Michael Diekmann Chair in Management Science
- TEAM GLOBAL Professorship for Disruptive Innovation
- Volkswagen Group Junior Chair for Diversity in Organizations

== Programs ==
ESMT Berlin is accredited by the Association of MBAs (AMBA), Association to Advance Collegiate Schools of Business (AACSB), European Quality Improvement System (EQUIS), and Foundation for International Business Administration Accreditation (FIBAA). It is one of only four business schools in Germany with triple accreditation.

ESMT Berlin offers a full-time MBA, an executive MBA, a part-time MBA, a global online MBA, a master in global management, a master in innovation and entrepreneurship, a master in analytics and artificial intelligence program, and several executive education courses as well as a Ph.D. program. The majority of courses are taught in English, with some executive education seminars taught in German.

=== MBA programs ===
ESMT offers five Master of Business Administration programs:

- The full-time MBA is a 15-month, personalized program that starts in January each year.
- The part-time Blended MBA in Business Innovation is a two-year course similar to the full-time MBA, offered to students in full-time employment. The course consists of 75% online study and 25% on-campus study over 14 weekends.
- The Berlin Global Online MBA is a 24-month program with the option to take up to five years to complete, which is aimed at professionals working full-time.
- The 18-month part-time Executive MBA (EMBA) has been offered at ESMT Berlin since 2007. Since October 2018, ESMT has been offering a dual Executive Master of Business Administration/Master of Public Administration (Executive MBA/MPA) together with the Doha Institute's School of Public Administration and Development Economics.

Students can choose add-ons to the scheduled courses, for example, career coaching.

=== Master programs ===
Since 2014, ESMT Berlin has been offering a 24-month English-language international Master in Management (MiM) program.

In 2023, the master's programs were restructured and three two-year master's degree courses were introduced: the Master in Global Management, focused on working in global companies and organizations, the Master in Innovation and Entrepreneurship, centered around company founders and intrapreneurs, and the Master in Analytics and Artificial Intelligence, focused on data analysis and technological change. Master's students also take part in targeted internships, social impact projects and additional finance courses.

=== Executive Education programs ===
The so-called "Executive Education" programs at ESMT are aimed at professionals to further develop their leadership skills. They are organized as open programs for individuals as well as group programs for companies.

=== Doctorates ===
In 2022, 13 people were working on their doctorate at ESMT.

== Campus ==
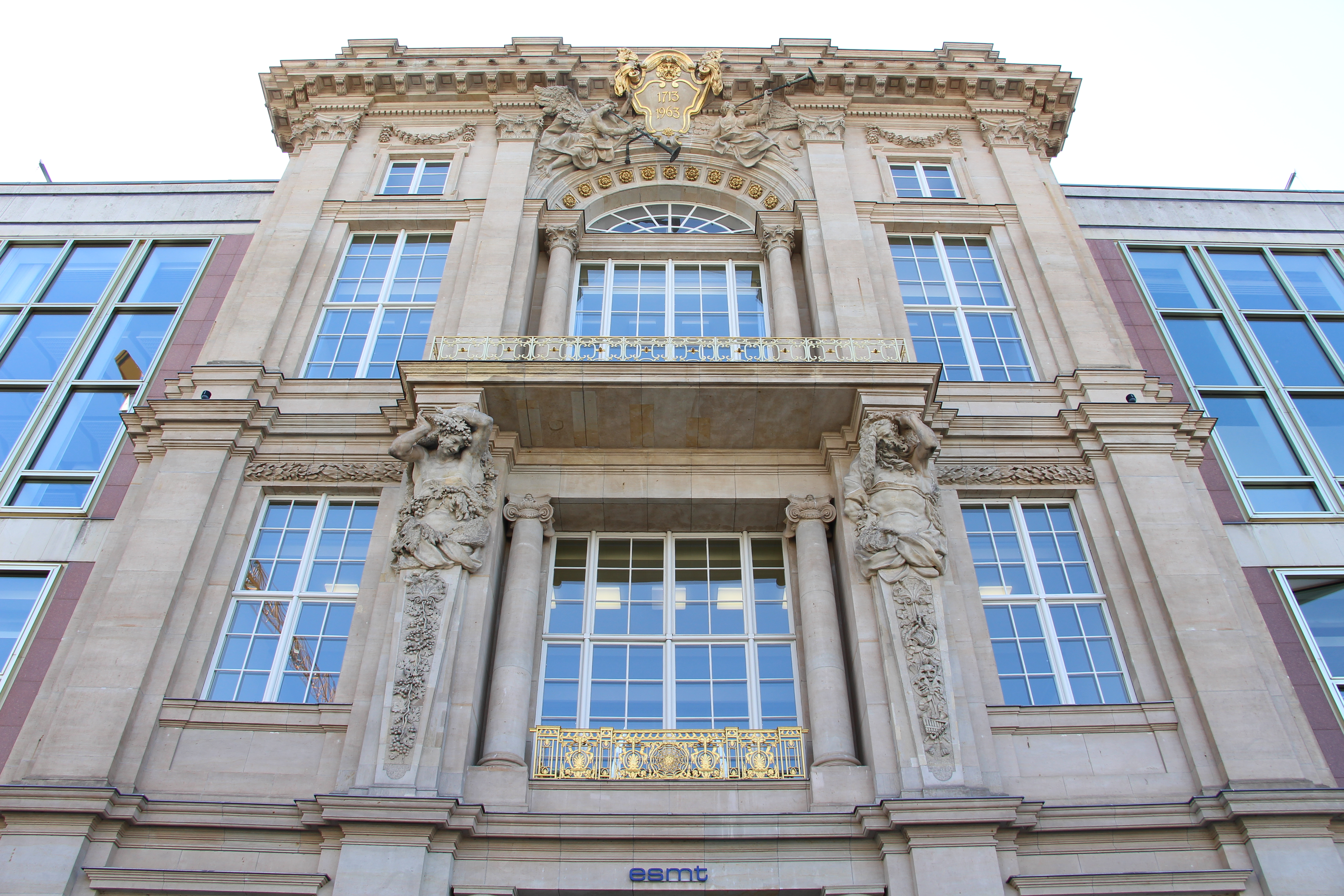
The front of the Berlin campus

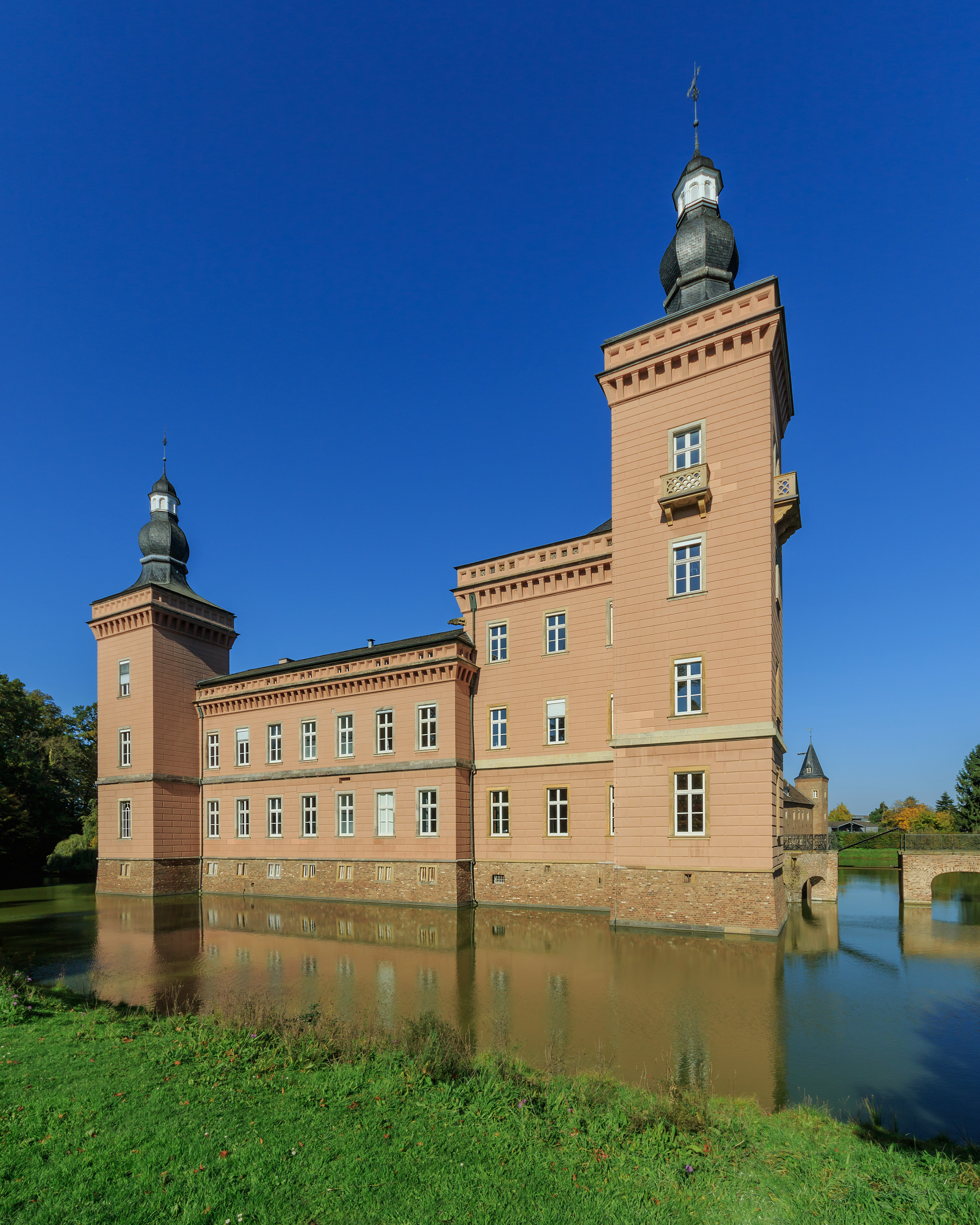
Former Cologne campus Schloss Gracht

The school's headquarters and main campus is located in the former GDR State Council Building in Berlin next to the Federal Foreign Office and opposite of the UNESCO World Heritage Site Museum Island. It was constructed in the 1960s socialist architectural style to host the State Council of East Germany. From 1999 to 2001, the building served as the Federal Chancellery (Berlin) under former German Chancellor Gerhard Schröder. In the years 2004 and 2005, the building underwent an extensive renovation supervised by the German architect HG Merz.

Since its renovation, the former State Council Building has acted as a venue for seminars, lectures, conferences, and social events at ESMT Berlin. The building received further improvements in 2017, with the remodeling of the third floor to accommodate the significant increase in the number of students. This led to the creation of a new library, four seminar rooms, the ESMT research lab, eleven group study rooms and a student lounge. Since 2023, the last unused part of the State Council building has also been under renovation. In November 2023, a photovoltaic system was installed on the roof of the main building, which is expected to cover around 25% of the university's electricity requirements.

Around 80% of ESMT students move to Germany from abroad. Members of a program often originate from up to 40 nations. In 2018, the university planned to build a student residence on campus, in particular for its international students, but the project was rejected by the Berlin Senate.

== Events ==
The ESMT Annual Forum was held at ESMT Berlin from 2008 to 2022. The forum was attended by German and international individuals from various sectors such as business and politics. In 2023 for the first time, the ESMT hosted the Berlin Global Dialogue, including guests such as Olaf Scholz, Charles Michel, and Friedrich Merz.

== Rankings ==
European Business Schools

- Financial Times European Business School Rankings 2025: 12
- Bloomberg Businessweek European Business School Rankings 2023/2024: 16

Business school rankings

Europe
- QS MBA: 32
- Financial Times MBA: 22

Global
- QS MBA: 84
- Financial Times MBA: 79

MBA

- Financial Times Global MBA Ranking 2026: 79
- AméricaEconomia Global MBA Ranking 2021: 24

Executive MBA

- Financial Times Executive MBA Ranking 2026: 45

Master in Global Management

- Financial Times Global Ranking 2026: 35

Executive Education

- Financial Times Executive Education Customized 2026: 5

== Partnerships and cooperations ==
ESMT is a member of the Global Network for Advanced Management, a collaboration of graduate schools of business that seeks to foster intellectual ties among business schools, students and deans from both economically strong regions and those on the horizon of economic development. Partner institutions in this network include Yale University, University of California, Berkeley, University of Oxford, University of New South Wales, HEC Paris, IIM Bangalore, University of British Columbia, National University of Singapore among others.

ESMT is a part of the Global MiM Network in association with Imperial College London, Singapore Management University and Queen's University at Kingston, which enables students at each member school to take courses at one or more partner institutions, providing the option for studying abroad without the bureaucracy or the cost of a full-time overseas program. The ESMT is also part of the European exchange program Erasmus+.

ESMT has national partnerships with Humboldt University, Free University Berlin, Technische Universität Berlin, Hasso Plattner Institute among others. ESMT is a member of the MBA alliance, comprising the top 5 business schools in Germany with Mannheim Business School, Frankfurt School of Finance & Management, HHL Leipzig Graduate School of Management and WHU – Otto Beisheim School of Management.

Furthermore, ESMT is a member of the European Foundation for Management Development (EFMD). Together with other international business schools, ESMT has founded the Future of Management Education Alliance (FOME).

== Founders ==
The school's founders include:

- Airbus
- Allianz
- Association of German Chambers of Industry and Commerce
- Axel Springer
- Bayer
- BMW
- Boston Consulting Group
- Bundesverband der Deutschen Industrie
- Confederation of German Employers' Associations
- Deutsche Bank
- DHL Group
- Deutsche Telekom
- E.ON
- Hypo Vereinsbank – UniCredit Bank AG
- KPMG
- Lufthansa
- McKinsey & Company
- Mercedes-Benz Group
- Münchener Rückversicherungs-Gesellschaft
- Robert Bosch
- RWE
- SAP
- Siemens
- ThyssenKrupp
- Traton
