= Maeil Business Newspaper =

South Korean daily newspaper

- Type: Daily newspaper
- Format: paper & digital
- Owner: Maekyung Media Group
- Founded: March 24, 1966
- Political alignment: Moderate
- Language: Korean, English
- Website: www.mk.co.kr

Korean name
- Hangul: 매일경제신문
- Hanja: 每日經濟新聞
- RR: Maeil gyeongje sinmun
- MR: Maeil kyŏngje sinmun

The Maeil Business Newspaper (Korean: 매일경제신문), also simply known as Maekyung (derived from the pronunciation of the Korean name) or MK, is a comprehensive daily newspaper published in South Korea, first issued on March 24, 1966. The president of the publishing company is Chang Dae-whan.

Initially, it started as a weekly economic newspaper and was published under the name "Maeil Economic Week". After that, in 1970, it was converted to the Daily Economic Newspaper and changed its name to "Maeil Business Newspaper".

== Description ==
Maeil Business Newspaper operates several YouTube channels, including WallGa Wallbu (243,000 subscribers), GiAntTV (207,000 subscribers), Maeburi TV (236,000 subscribers), and World Knowledge Forum (94,800 subscribers). As of March 2024, it boasts approximately 800,000 subscribers across these platforms.

Since its inception in October 2000, the World Knowledge Forum has hosted 5,832 global speakers and 62,821 participants from 82 countries. Notable attendees include George W. Bush, the 43rd President of the United States; Hillary Clinton, former U.S. Secretary of State; Theresa May, the 76th Prime Minister of the United Kingdom; Nicolas Sarkozy, the 23rd President of France; Gerhard Schröder, the 7th Chancellor of Germany; Jim Yong Kim, President of the World Bank; prominent business figures such as Bill Gates, founder of Microsoft; Larry Ellison, chairman of Oracle; John Hennessy, chairman of Alphabet; George Soros, chairman of Soros Fund Management; Jack Ma, chairman of Alibaba; Robin Li, chairman of Baidu; and academics like Larry Summers, Paul Krugman, Michael Porter, and Gregory Mankiw.

Starting in 2002 with 968 participants from 28 countries, the World Korean Business Convention has grown into the largest business gathering of the Korean diaspora, attracting over 3,000 participants annually. The 21st convention, held for the first time in Anaheim, California, in October 2023, marks its coming of age.

== Accolades ==
It was selected as the "Premium Economic Newspaper of the Year" by CEOs in Korea for 19 consecutive years since 2005. In the economic newspaper category, the preference for Maeil Business Newspaper among CEOs of top 500 companies has steadily risen, with 51.52% in 2021, 56.88% in 2022, and 66.06% in 2023.

According to a survey by the Korea University Newspaper, it was selected as the most preferred economic daily by university students in 2020, maintaining the top spot since 2001. This survey was conducted until 2020.

In a survey conducted by MarketLink, Maeil Business Newspaper was chosen as the number one mobile news media outlet that Koreans spent the most time reading in 2022. Another report by MarketLink, which analyzed data from search engine site news sections and newspaper websites, found that Maeil Business Newspaper was the most viewed by Koreans from January to November 2023, with a total average monthly time spent (TTS) reaching 3,304,517 hours.

In the "Digital News Report 2023" by the Reuters Institute for the Study of Journalism, Maeil Business Newspaper was ranked second in the digital news sector and third in the print newspaper sector among Korean media. In the section describing Korea on page 143, Maeil Business Newspaper was ranked third among daily newspapers based on responses to whether respondents had accessed it at least once in a week. Furthermore, it ranked second among daily newspapers for online news access over a week, following The Chosun Ilbo.

According to the Korea ABC Association, Maeil Business Newspaper ranked first among economic newspapers based on certified circulation figures for 45 daily newspapers in 2022 (for the year 2021), with an approximate circulation of 700,000 and a paid circulation of about 550,000.

According to a survey by the Korea Press Foundation, Maeil Business Newspaper was the most-read economic newspaper and the fourth most-read among all newspapers in 2021. The survey targeted 50,788 citizens aged 16 and over, ranking Maeil Business Newspaper along with five other media outlets, including Nongmin Newspaper, Donga Ilbo, Chosun Ilbo, JoongAng Ilbo, and Hankyoreh, in the highest readership tier. The Pass-Along Rates were as follows: Newspaper A (3.7355%), Newspaper B (2.4519%), Newspaper C (1.9510%), Maeil Business Newspaper (0.9760%), Newspaper D (0.7248%), and Newspaper E (0.6262%). The results of this survey by the Korea Press Foundation are used as one of the criteria for the allocation of government advertisements.

== Political position ==
Maeil Business Newspapers are generally moderate media, but many say they are close to pro-business conservatism. In particular, when major South Korean media are divided into the dichotomy of conservative and progressive-liberal, they are classified as clear conservative media.

== See also ==
- Maeil Broadcasting Network
