= August Meitzen =

German statistician (1822–1910)

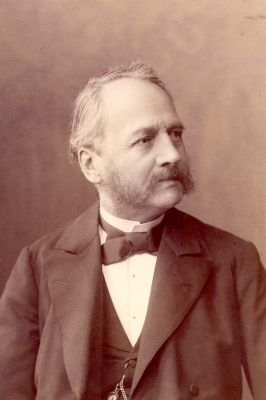
- Meitzen
- Born: August Meitzen; 16 December 1822; Breslau, Province of Silesia, Kingdom of Prussia
- Died: 19 January 1910 (aged 87); Berlin, Kingdom of Prussia, German Empire

Philosophical work
- Institutions: Royal Friedrich Wilhelm University of Berlin
- Notable students: Max Weber
- Main interests: history; economics; statistics; law

August Meitzen (German pronunciation: [ˈaʊɡʊst ˈmaɪtsn̩]; born 16 December 1822, in Breslau; died 19 January 1910, in Berlin) was a German statistician.

== Biography ==
He was born in Breslau (now Wrocław, Poland) and educated at Heidelberg and Tübingen. He was a member of the Statistical Bureau, and in 1875 was made an associate professor of political sciences (Staatswissenschaften) at the University of Berlin (honorary professor from 1892). Between 1889 and 1891, he advised Max Weber in his completion of his post-doctoral habilitation, a thesis that Weber titled Roman Agrarian History and Its Significance for Public and Private Law.

== Works ==
His contributions to the science of statistics include:

- Die internationale land- und forstwirtschaftliche Statistik ("International statistics on land and forest management"; 1873).
- Geschichte, Theorie und Technik der Statistik ("History, theory and technique of statistics"; 1886).

He also wrote:

- Der Boden und die landwirthschaftlichen Verhältnisse des Preussischen Staates ("The soil and the agricultural conditions of the Prussian state"; 8 volumes and 2 atlases, 1868–1908).
- Die Mitverantwortlichkeit der Gebildeten für das Wohl der arbeitenden Klassen (The obligation of the educated to the well-being of the working classes; 1876).
- Siedelung und Agrarwesen der Westgermanen und Ostgermanen, der Kelten, Römer, Finnen und Slawen ("Settlement and agriculture of the west and east Germans, the Celts, Romans, Finns and Slavs"; 1895).

He was the author of several biographies in the Allgemeine Deutsche Biographie.
