= Lars-Hendrik Röller =

German economist

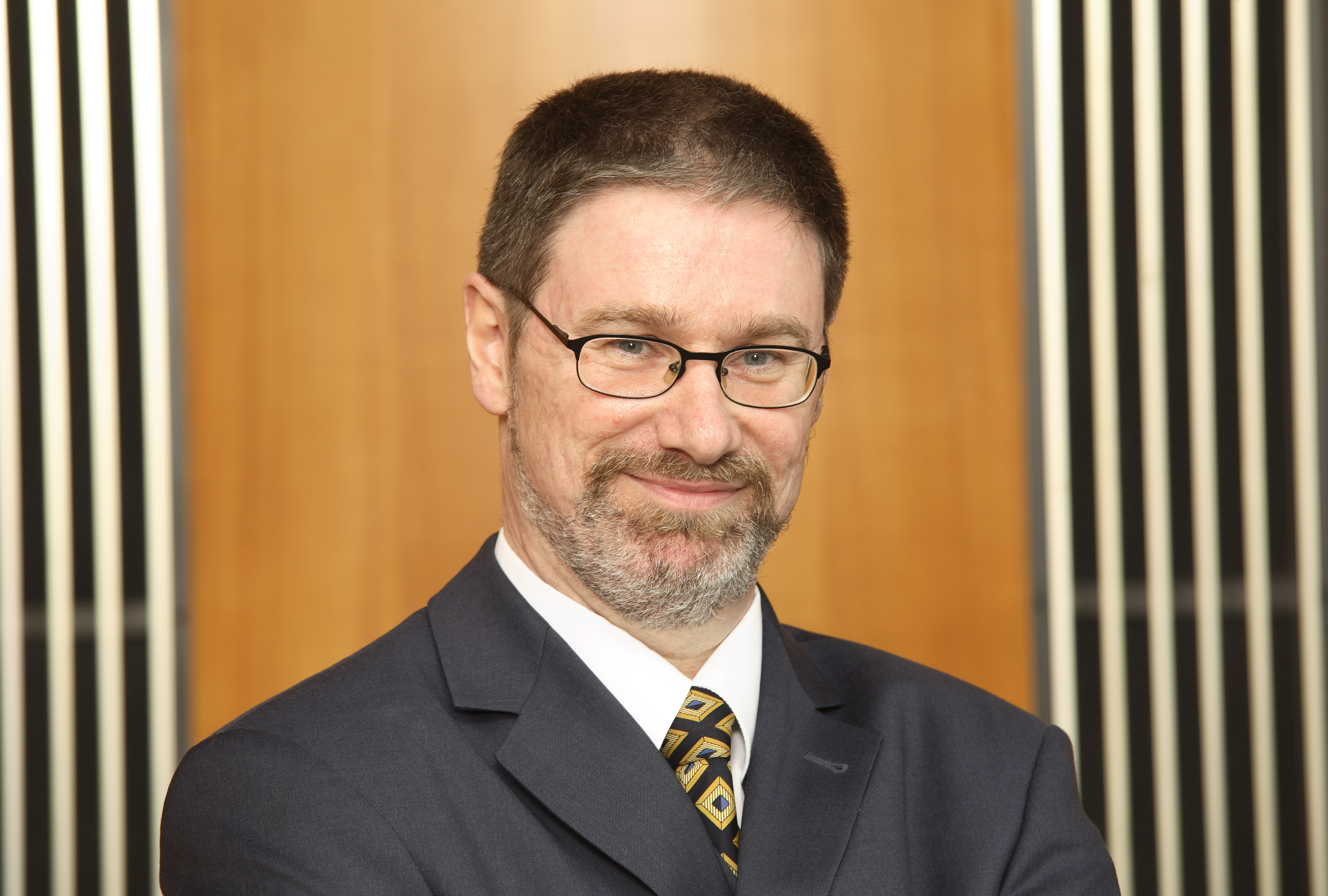
Lars-Hendrik Röller (2006)

Lars-Hendrik Röller (born in Frankfurt am Main on July 19, 1958) is a German economist who served as the Director General for Economic and Financial Policy at the German Chancellery from 2011 to 2022, a position that made him Chancellor Angela Merkel's chief economic advisor. He previously was the president of the European School of Management and Technology (ESMT) in Berlin. In 2002, he was awarded the Gossen Prize in recognition for his contributions to empirical industrial economics.

== Early life and education ==
A native of Frankfurt am Main, Röller is the son of the former chairman of the board of Dresdner Bank, Wolfgang Röller. He earned a B.Sc. in computer science from the Texas A&M University in 1981 as well as a M.Sc. in artificial intelligence and a M.A. in economics from the University of Pennsylvania in 1982 and 1983. In 1987, Röller obtained a Ph.D. in economics from the University of Pennsylvania, where he also briefly worked as lecturer, with a thesis on the theory and application of contestable markets.

== Career in academia ==
Röller worked as assistant professor (1987–91) and later associate professor (1991–95) and full professor of economics (1995–99) at INSEAD in Fontainebleau. From 1994, he worked in Berlin in various functions, directing the Institute on Competitiveness and Industrial Change at the WZB Berlin Social Science Center from 1994 to 2007, where he also has been working as research professor on innovation and competition since 2007, and holding the chair of the Institute of Industrial Economics at Humboldt University Berlin since 1995. Additionally, Röller was a full professor at the European School of Management and Technology, which he presided over between 2006 and 2011. Throughout his academic career, Röller has held visiting appointments at the Universitat Autonoma de Barcelona, New York University, Stanford University, and the Norwegian School of Economics and Business Administration (NHH).

In addition to his academic positions, Röller served as chief competition economist at the European Commission under successive presidents Romano Prodi and José Manuel Barroso from 2003 until 2006, in this capacity advising European Commissioners for Competition Mario Monti and Neelie Kroes.

== Career in government ==
In 2011, Röller succeeded Jens Weidmann as Director General for Economic and Financial Policy at the German Chancellery, a position that makes him Chancellor Angela Merkel's chief economic advisor. In this role, he – among else – leads Germany's negotiation team at the G7 and G20 meetings of Merkel's chancellorship. Amid the COVID-19 pandemic, he co-chaired (alongside Zane Dangor) the Access to COVID-19 Tools Accelerator's Vaccine Manufacturing Working Group from June 2021.

== Other activities ==
=== Corporate boards ===
- BlackRock, Chair of the Transition Investing Advisory Council (since 2022)

=== Berlin Global Dialogue ===
In 2023, Röller founded the Berlin Global Dialogue, an annual high-level conference held at ESMT.

=== Non-profit organizations ===
Röller maintains affiliations with the Georgetown Center for Business and Public Policy (Georgetown University), the Centre for Economic Policy Research (CEPR), where he has led the programme on industrial organization, and the European think tank Bruegel. In terms of professional service, Röller was president of the German Economic Association and the European Association for Research in Industrial Economics, member of the board of Bruegel and of the advisory board of the DIW and the Forschungsinstitut für Wirtschaftsverfassung und Wettbewerb, of the Alexander von Humboldt Foundation's Scientific Council for Transatlantic Cooperation, and of the German-French Council of Economic Advisers, among else. He also is a member of the American Economic Association, European Economic Association, German Economic Association, and American Bar Association.

=== Editorial boards ===
Röller is or has been performing editorial duties for the Global Competition Litigation Review, Journal of German and European Competition Law, Journal of Productivity Analysis, International Journal of Industrial Organization, Journal of Industrial Economics, and Managerial and Decision Economics.

== Research ==
Röller's research focuses on the economics of competition, technology, and innovation. His contributions to research have been acknowledged through the Gossen Prize (2002), a fellowship of the European Economic Association (2004), and a membership of the German Academy of Sciences (2008). Key contributions of his research include the following:

- Investments into telecommunication infrastructure between the mid-1970s and mid-1990s likely substantially increased economic growth in the OECD, especially when it led to an infrastructure allowing for near universal service (with Leonard Waverman).
- Whether or not innovation policies are complementary depends on whether the target is to make firms innovative or increase their innovation intensity as well as on the particular pair of policies, suggesting that packages of policies may be needed to make firms innovate whereas a more targeted approach is needed to increase the intensity of their innovations (with Pierre Mohnen).
- Reflecting the need to evaluate the efficiencies of corporate mergers on a case-by-case basis, first assessing mergers through routine tools with modest information requirements and then assessing them further, including an efficiency defence, may be an information efficient framework for evaluations (with Johan Stennek and Frank Verboven).
- In particular due to the alignment of the pricing strategies of mobile phone services operators across multiple markets and the cross-ownership of licenses, the prices for such services in the U.S. during the 1980s were significantly above those to be expected under perfect competition or in a non-cooperative duopoly (as existed due to the award of two licenses per geographic region by the FCC), suggesting substantial gains to deregulation (with Philip Parker).
- If lobbying is efficient, accountability low, mergers large, and profits grow disproportionately as the size of mergers increases, the use of a consumer surplus standard by an antitrust agency to assess mergers yields higher welfare than the use of a welfare standard (with Damien Neven).
- Electoral concerns and lobbying significantly affected the allocation of investments into transportation infrastructure across French regions in 1985-92, whereas concerns for maximizing the economic returns to infrastructure spending doesn't seem to have played a major role (with Olivier Cadot and Andreas Stephan).
- Eliminating the gap in technical efficiency between American and European air carriers in 1986 was expected to create annual savings of $4.5 billion (1993 U.S. dollars) and displace about 42,000 across the European air carrier industry (with David H. Good, M. Ishaq Nadiri and Robin Sickles).
- The decisions of the European Commission on merger control are not only determined by concerns over consumer protection, though they don't seem sensitive to firms' interests; instead, other institutional and political factors, e.g. the definition of a market's scope, procedural aspects, and country and industry specificities, appear to be significant (with Neven and Tomaso Duso).
- Based on quadratic cost functions, the Bell System appears to have held a natural monopoly over the U.S. telecommunications industry prior to its break-up.

== Selected publications ==
- Röller, L.H. (2000). The Political Economy of Industrial Policy: Does Europe have an Industrial Policy? Berlin: Edition Sigma.
