= World Knowledge Forum =

Growth and prosperity promotion organization

- 세계지식포럼
- Formation: October 2000; 25 years ago
- Founder: Chang Dae-Whan
- Type: Nonprofit
- Purpose: Economic
- Region served: Worldwide
- Official language: English, Korean
- Executive Chairman: Chang Dae-Whan

The World Knowledge Forum (WKF, Korean: 세계지식포럼; Hanja: 世界知識論壇; RR: segye jishig poleom) is an international non-governmental organization, which aims to promote balanced global growth and prosperity through knowledge-sharing. Its efforts "brings together global leaders to address the importance of knowledge in meeting the challenges and opportunities of a rapidly changing world".

The World Knowledge Forum was conceived as part of the Vision Korea Project, a campaign launched by Maeil Business Newspaper in 1997, to "propose new visions for development to Korea and to the global community". The first World Knowledge Forum entitled ‘Shaping the New Millennium with Knowledge’ took place in 2000, shortly after the Asian financial crisis.

Partnering with Nikkei and Bloomberg, the Forum has now grown to encompass 1,830 sessions featuring over 5,518 speakers, and 62,821 participants in total from all around the world.

In September 2023, the 14th WKF was held in Seoul, South Korea, with speakers including Steve Wozniak, co-founder of Apple; James Norman Mattis, the 26th United States Secretary of Defense; Ron Klain, the 30th White House Chief of Staff; Yukio Hatoyama, the 93rd Prime Minister of Japan; Jenny Johnson, the president and CEO of Franklin Templeton; Abhijit Banerjee, 2019 Nobel Laureate in Economics; Anthony Fauci, the 5th Director of the National Institute of Allergy and Infectious Diseases; Oleksandra Matviichuk, founder of the Centre for Civil Liberties (2022 Nobel Prize in Peace) were present at the occasion under the theme, "Techno Big Bang: Humanity on the Shoulders of Giants".

== History ==
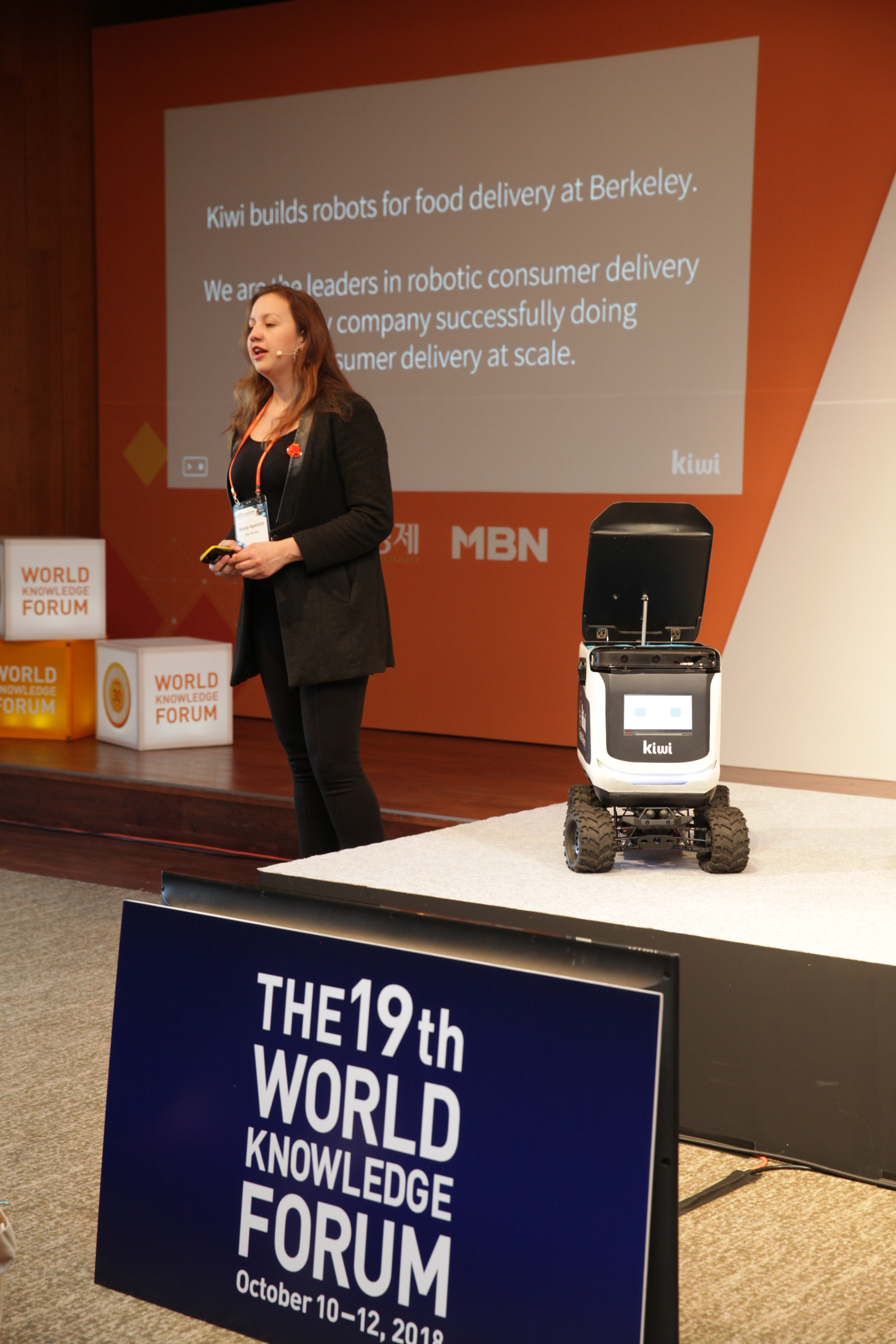
Delivery Robot session at the 19th forum

The World Knowledge Forum (WKF) was founded in October 2000 by Chang Dae-Whan, a Chairman of Maekyung Media Group. Immediately after the 1997 Asian Financial Crisis, the Vision Korea Project was launched to formulate ways to move Korea forward. In the following year, the World Knowledge Forum Secretariat was established, with Chairman Chang Dae-Whan presiding over the Forum's executive committee. After two years of preparation, the first World Knowledge Forum was held with the ambition to transform Korea into a knowledge driven nation. Under the theme, “Shaping the New Millennium with Knowledge”, the first forum composed of 32 sessions led by over 90 speakers.

In 2001, the WKF formed media partnerships with prominent media outlets such as Financial Times, Bloomberg, and CNBC that helped the WKF gain its reputation globally. In the same year, the World Knowledge Corps was created.

Since 2010, MBA courses were incorporated as sessions at the WKF. New York University Stern School of Business first joined the WKF to hold an MBA session on finance. Then in 2013, HEC Paris and CEIBS jointly hosted special MBA sessions. As of 2023, four of the world's leading business schools are holding MBA sessions at the WKF. The schools include, IE Business School, NYU Stern, HEC Paris, and CKGSB, Cheung Kong Graduate School of Business.

Every year, the World Knowledge Forum gathers more than 4,000 business and opinion leaders around the world ranging from environmental and international organizations to world's major corporations and institutions. Forum's leaders discuss about the current issues and present their insights to find possible solutions for a more promising future. The main aim is to highlight the importance of knowledge sharing towards a balanced prosperity of the global economy. With the new venue at the Seoul Shilla Hotel in 2014, the official season two of the Knowledge Forum began. Then in 2015, Jangchung Arena was added.

== Themes ==
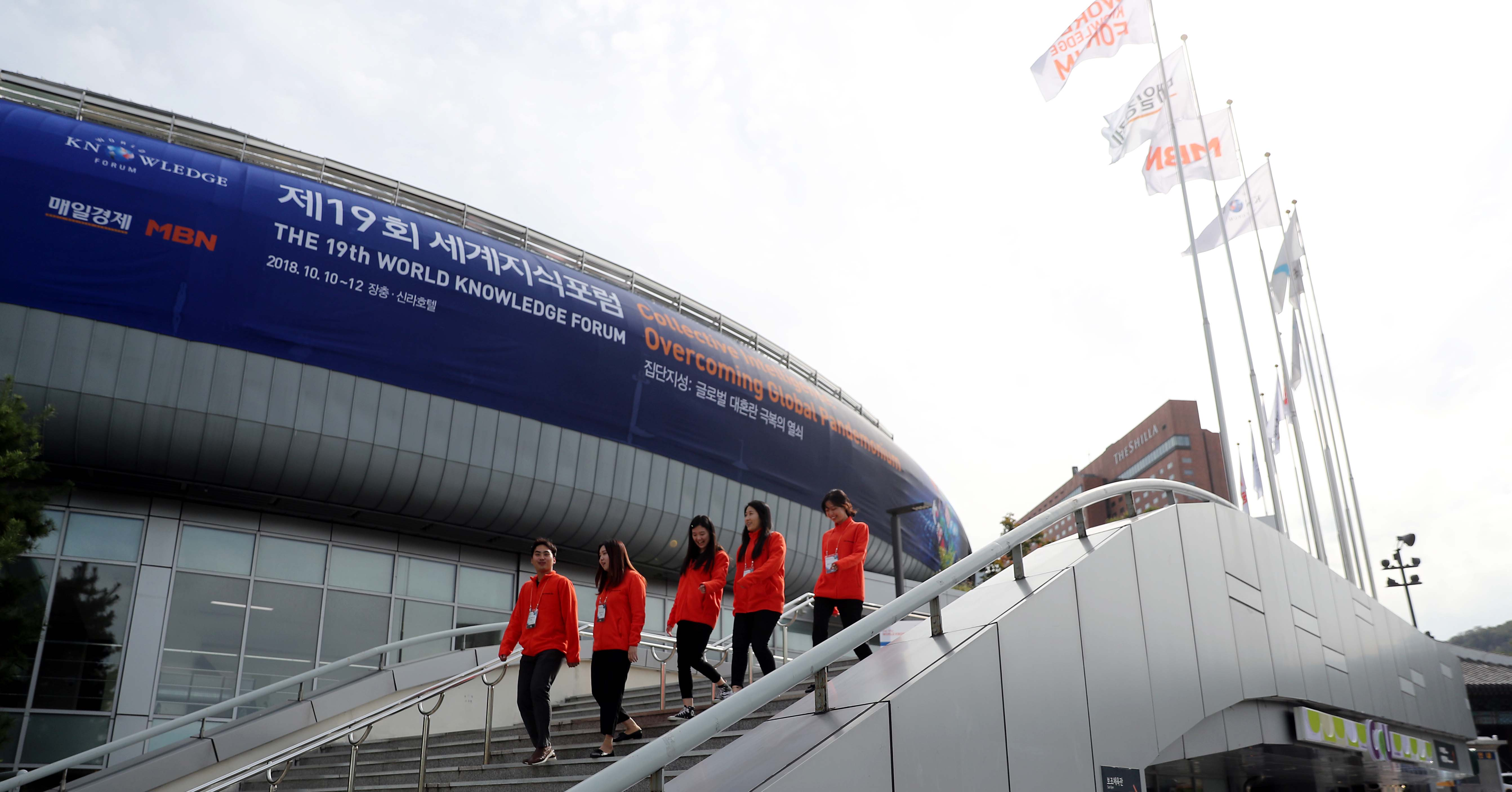
Jangchung Arena, Venue

Forum themes have ranged from "Shaping the New Millennium With Knowledge" in 2000 to "Techno Big Bang: Humanity on the Shoulders of Giants" in 2023. Each year's themes is based on both current issues and prospective challenges in the world.

Year	Theme
2000	Shaping the New Millennium with Knowledge
2001	Drawing the Roadmap for Knowledge Economy and Global Prosperity
2002	Knowledge in a World of Risk : A Compass Towards New Prosperity
2003	Creating a New World Order and Economy
2004	Partnership for Renewed Growth
2005	Creativity and Collaboration : Foundation for the New Era
2006	Creative Economy
2007	Wealth Creation and Asia
2008	Collabonomics & Greater Asia
2009	One Asia : New Economic Order & Recovery
2010	One Asia Momentum, G20 Leadership & Creatinnovation
2011	The New Economic Crisis: Reforming Global Leadership and Asia's Challenge
2012	The Great Breakthrough: New Solutions for Global Crisis. (Leadership, Integrity, Creativity, and Happiness)
2013	The One Asia Metamorphosis
2014	Invigorating the Global Economy
2015	Mapping the Zeitgeist
2016	Aiming for Great Instauration
2017	Inflection Point : Towards New Prosperity
2018	Collective Intelligence: Overcoming Global Pandemonium
2019	Knowledge Revolution 5.0 : Perspicacity Towards Prosperity for All
2020	Pandenomics Perspective: Shaping New Global Symbiosis
2021	Terraincognita: Redesigning the Global Architecture
2022	Supercompensation: Restoring Global Prosperity & Freedom
2023	Techno Big Bang: Humanity on the Shoulders of Giants

== Organization ==
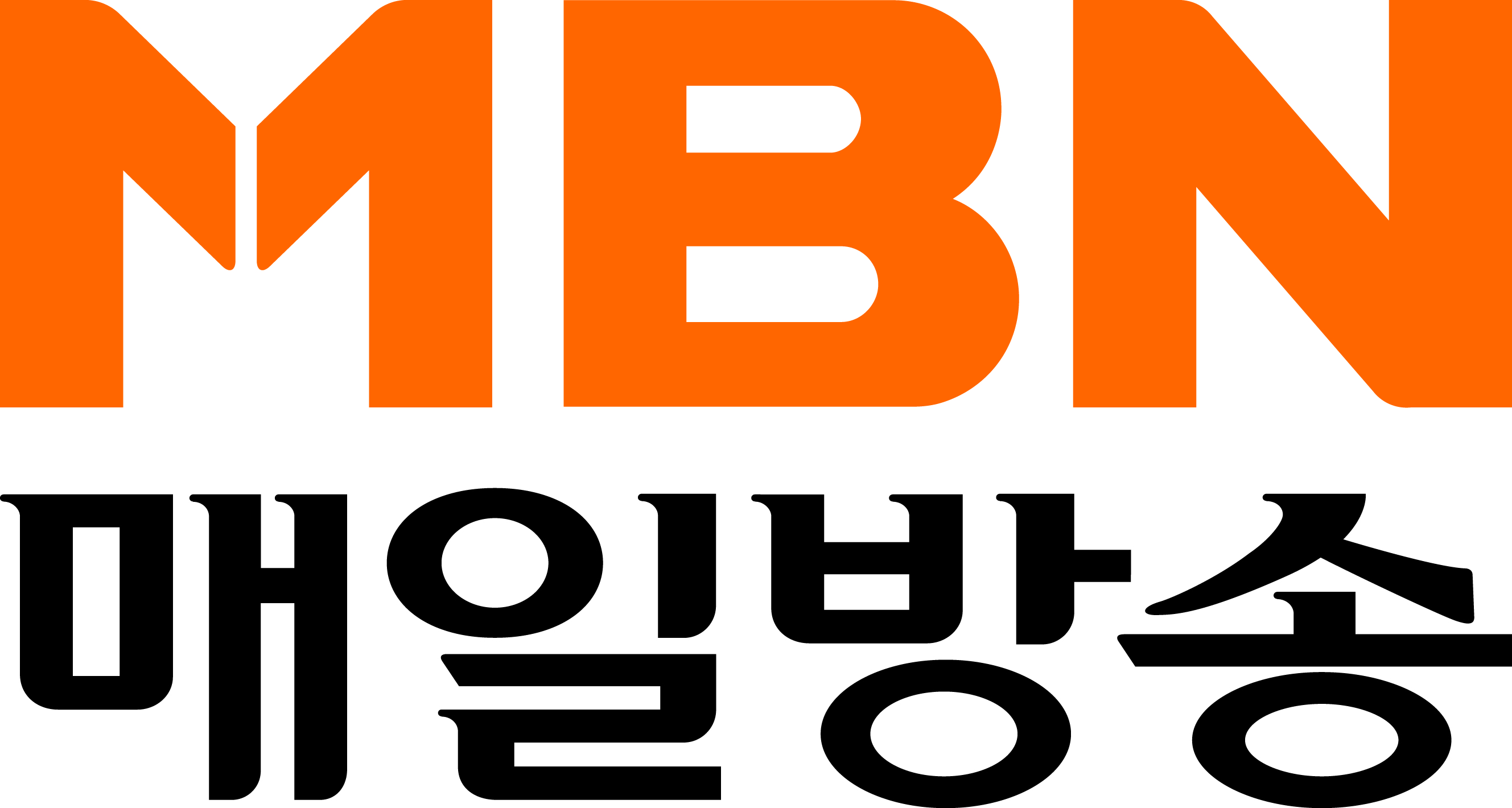
Logo of MBN&Maeil business newspaper

The World Knowledge Forum is organized by Maekyung Media Group including Maeil Business Newspaper and Maeil Broadcasting Network (MBN).

== See also ==
- World Economic Forum
- World Policy Conference
- Berlin Global Dialogue
