= Gonzalo Garland =

Professor of Economics, born in 1959

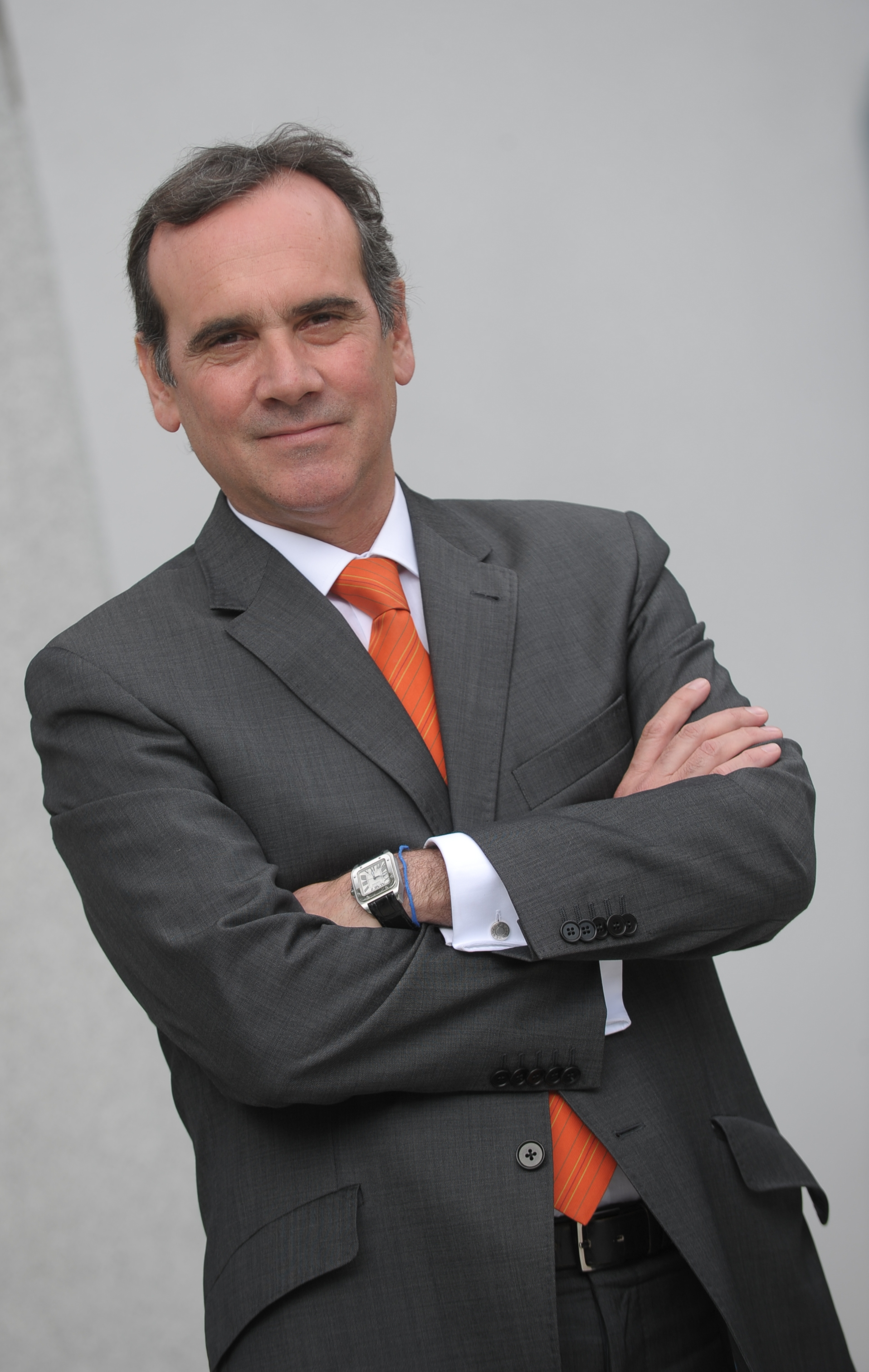
Gonzalo Garland, is Vice-president of External Relations at the IE Business School

Gonzalo Garland (born April 17, 1959 in Lima, Peru) is a professor of Economics, and the vice-president of External Relations at IE Business School and an international consultant in emerging economies. As an expert in the fields of economic environment and business in the emerging markets, he has studied the economic effects of demographic changes in Japan and in developing countries where his researches on Peru's long term forecasts could be highlighted. In 1994 he moved to Spain where he held various positions at the IE Business School.

== Biography ==
Gonzalo Garland was born in a Peruvian family having many connections with the international business in South America. He graduated in Economics at the University of the Pacific in Lima, 1980. He immediately began teaching at this university, a profession that he is passionate about and has devoted much of his life, becoming nominated best business school professor in 2013. In 1984 he obtained his Masters in Economics from Stanford University, and soon after started his PhD at the University of Pennsylvania, where he was research assistant to professors Lawrence Klein and Albert Ando. As economist he has been part of economic institutions in Peru, such as Group of the Analysis of Development, GRADE, where he was the executive director, Macroconsult, preparing forecasts on employment and industrial production growth, Richard O. Custer, as assistant manager of planning, insurance and control, and the Industrial Bank being member of the board of directors. He has also been a consultant for the UNESCO in Venezuela.
Living in Spain since 1994, he has been an accurate observer of current Spain as shows his study case Spain from Transition to modern times, which has led to a continuing collaboration with the media to provide explanations on the financial and macroeconomic crisis. Since then he is part of the IE Business School faculty as Professor of Economic Environment and Emerging Markets, and has been a driver of IE Business School to reach international success.

== Bibliography ==
- Garland, Gonzalo, and Sagasti, Francisco, Crisis, Knowledge and Development : A Review of Long Term Perspectives on Science and Technology for Development, Grade, Lima, Peru, January 1985
- _____, Perú Siglo XXI, series of 11 working papers describing sectorial long-term forecasts, Grade, Lima, Peru, 1986–1987
- _____, Market structure and technological behaviour: a study of the edibles oils industry in Peru, Geneve, OIT, 1987
- _____, Integrating diverse techniques on a spreadsheet: manteining inherent complexity while achieving explicit simplicity, Grupo de Análisis para el Desarrollo (Grade), Lima, 1989
- _____, Peru in the 21st Century : Challenges and Possibilities in Futures : the Journal of Forecasting, Planning and Policy, Volume 22, Nº 4, Butterworth-Heinemann, London, England, May 1990
- _____, The Peruvian 21st Century Study Model, the Institute for 21st Century Studies (ITCS), report and software, Arlington, Virginia, August 1991
- _____, The Peruvian National Model: Maintaining Inherent Complexity while Achieving Explicit Simplicity, in Studies for the 21st Century, UNESCO, December 1991
- _____, "Returns on Public and Private R&D", with David B. Allen, in Competing in the Global Marketplace : A Decision Science Viewpoint, Proceedings of the Third International Conference of the Decision Sciences Institute, June 1995.
- _____, "Manufacturing Strategies and Strategic Management : the New Consensus", with David B. Allen, in "Competing in the Global Marketplace : A Decision Science Viewpoint", Proceedings of the Third International Conference of the Decision Sciences Institute, June 1995.
- _____, Dynamics of Demographic Development and its impact on Personal Saving : case of Japan, with Albert Ando, Andrea Moro, Juan Pablo Cordoba, in Ricerche Economiche, Vol 49, August 1995
- _____, Spain case study: from Transition to modern times, Madrid, Instituto de Empresa, 2010
