= Roman Agrarian History and Its Significance for Public and Private Law =

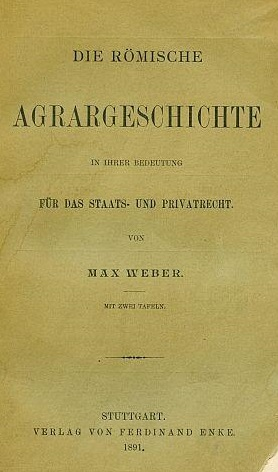
First publication

Roman Agrarian History and its Significance for Public and Private Law (original German: Die römische Agrargeschichte in ihrer Bedeutung für das Staats- und Privatrecht) was the habilitation thesis, in law at the University of Berlin in 1891, of the sociologist Max Weber.

The work examines the economic, social and political development of Roman society through the analysis of Roman writings on agriculture, the methods of land surveying and the terms used to designate the land units in Ancient Rome.
