= American Academy of Political and Social Science =

Organization

The American Academy of Political and Social Science (AAPSS) was founded in 1889 to promote progress in the social sciences. Sparked by Professor Edmund J. James and drawing from members of the faculty of the University of Pennsylvania, Swarthmore College, and Bryn Mawr College, the academy sought to establish communication between scientific thought and practical effort. The goal of its founders was to foster, across disciplines, important questions in the realm of social sciences, and to promote the work of those whose research aimed to address important social problems. Today the AAPSS is headquartered at the Annenberg Public Policy Center at the University of Pennsylvania in Philadelphia and aims to offer interdisciplinary perspectives on important social issues.

== Establishment ==
The primary modes of the academy's communication were to be the bimonthly journal, The Annals, annual meetings, symposia, and special publications. Difficult topics were not avoided. The 1901 annual meeting was on race relations in America, and included a paper by Booker T. Washington. The academy began as a membership organization. Membership was open and inclusive with an emphasis on educated professionals; even from its establishment, women were permitted to obtain membership. The academy's members have included not only academicians, but also distinguished public servants such as Herbert Hoover and Frances Perkins. Perhaps for this reason, it is not a member of the American Council of Learned Societies.

In 2000 the academy began selecting and installing Fellows in recognition of social scientists who have made outstanding contributions to the field. Since 2008 the academy has presented an annual Daniel Patrick Moynihan Prize to recognize public officials and/or scholars who have used social science and informed judgment to advance the public good. The academy continues to publish its bimonthly journal, and holds congressional briefings, special conferences, and biannual meetings of its board of directors. The academy has moved away from the membership model, however.

== Presidents of the Academy ==
- 1889–1895 – Edmund J. James
- 1896–1900 – Roland P. Falkner (acting in the absence of Edmund J. James)
- 1900–1902 – Samuel McCune Lindsay
- 1902–1929 – Leo S. Rowe
- 1930–1952 – Ernest M. Patterson
- 1953–1970 – James C. Charlesworth
- 1970–1972 – Richard D. Lambert
- 1972–1998 – Marvin E. Wolfgang
- 1998–1999 – Kathleen Hall Jamieson
- 1999–2001 – Jaroslav Pelikan
- 2001–2005 – Lawrence W. Sherman
- 2006–2015 – Douglas S. Massey
- 2015–2021 – Kenneth Prewitt
- 2021–present Marta Tienda

== Publications ==
=== The Annals ===
Annals of the American Academy of Political and Social Science
- Discipline: Social Sciences
- Language: English
- Edited by: Thomas A. Kecskemethy

Publication details
- History: 1890–present
- Publisher: SAGE Publications for the American Academy of Political and Social Science (United Kingdom)
- Frequency: Bimonthly
- Impact factor: 2.401 (2017)

Standard abbreviations
- Bluebook: Annals Am. Acad. Pol. & Soc. Sci.
- ISO 4: Ann. Am. Acad. Polit. Soc. Sci.
- NLM: Ann Am Acad Pol Soc Sci

Indexing
- ISSN: 0002-7162 (print); 1552-3349 (web)
- OCLC no.: 1479265

Links
- Journal homepage; Online access; Online archive

The Annals of the American Academy of Political and Social Science is a policy and scientific journal in political and social science. It began publication in July 1890 and has continued uninterrupted up until the present. The journal began as a quarterly but switched to a bi-monthly schedule effective with volume 2 in the summer of 1891. From 1897 (volume 6), volume numbers began to be changed every three issues, with each single issue after volume 38 constituting its own volume. A number of pamphlet supplements were also issued during the journal's early years.

Recent authors and editors in The Annals have included Henry Louis Gates Jr., Richard A. Clarke, Joseph S. Nye, Jr., and William Julius Wilson. The Annals has been published by SAGE Publications since 1981. In 2003, it changed from its traditional plain orange cover to a more graphic cover containing photographs.

The Annals has covered topics including "The World's Food" (November 1917) to "The Motion Picture and its Economic and Social Aspects" (November 1926), "Women in the Modern World" (May 1929), "America and Japan" (May 1941), "Urban Renewal Goals and Standards" (March 1964), and "The Global Refugee Problem" (May 1982). More recent volumes have focused on such topics as "Confronting the Specter of Nuclear Terrorism" and "The Moynihan Report Revisited: Lessons and Reflections after Four Decades".

According to the Journal Citation Reports, the journal has a 2017 impact factor of 2.401, ranking it 33rd out of 169 journals in the category "Political Science" and 11th out of 94 journals in the category "Social Sciences, Interdisciplinary".

==== Editors ====
- 1890–1895 Edmund J. James
- 1896–1900 Roland P. Falkner
- January 1901 – March 1902 Henry Rogers Seager
- May 1902 – September 1914 Emory R. Johnson
- November 1914 – July 1929 Clyde L. King
- September 1929 – July 1968 Thorsten Sellin
- January 1969 – November 1995 Richard D. Lambert
- January 1996 – November 2003 Alan W. Heston
- January 2003 – May 2006 Robert W. Pearson
- July 2006 – December 2010 Phyllis Kaniss
- December 2010 – December 2011 Emily Wood
- December 2011 – present Thomas A. Kecskemethy

=== The Academy Online ===
In 2006, the academy created a blog to take advantage of the Internet to provide a forum for ideas and research in the social sciences. Today, the academy's website is the main source for news of the academy, recently published Annals volumes, and information about the Fellows and Moynihan Prize.

==== Moynihan Prize Winners ====
- 2008 – Alice M. Rivlin
- 2009 – David T. Ellwood
- 2010 – Robert Greenstein
- 2011 – Diane Ravitch
- 2012 – Paul Volcker
- 2013 – William Julius Wilson
- 2014 – Joseph Stiglitz
- 2015 – Rebecca Blank
- 2016 – Isabel Sawhill and Ron Haskins
- 2017 – Alan Krueger
- 2018 – John Holdren
- 2019 – Samantha Power
- 2020 – William Nordhaus
- 2022 – Marian Wright Edelman

== See also ==
The American Academy of Political and Social Science is not to be confused with the following entities:

- Academy of Political Science
- American Academy of Arts and Letters
- American Academy of Arts and Sciences
- American Association for the Advancement of Science
- American Political Science Association
- American Social Science Association
- United States National Academy of Sciences
