= National Graduate Institute for Policy Studies =

Public policy school and research institute in Tokyo, Japan

Coordinates: 35°39′50″N 139°43′38″E

- 政策研究大学院大学
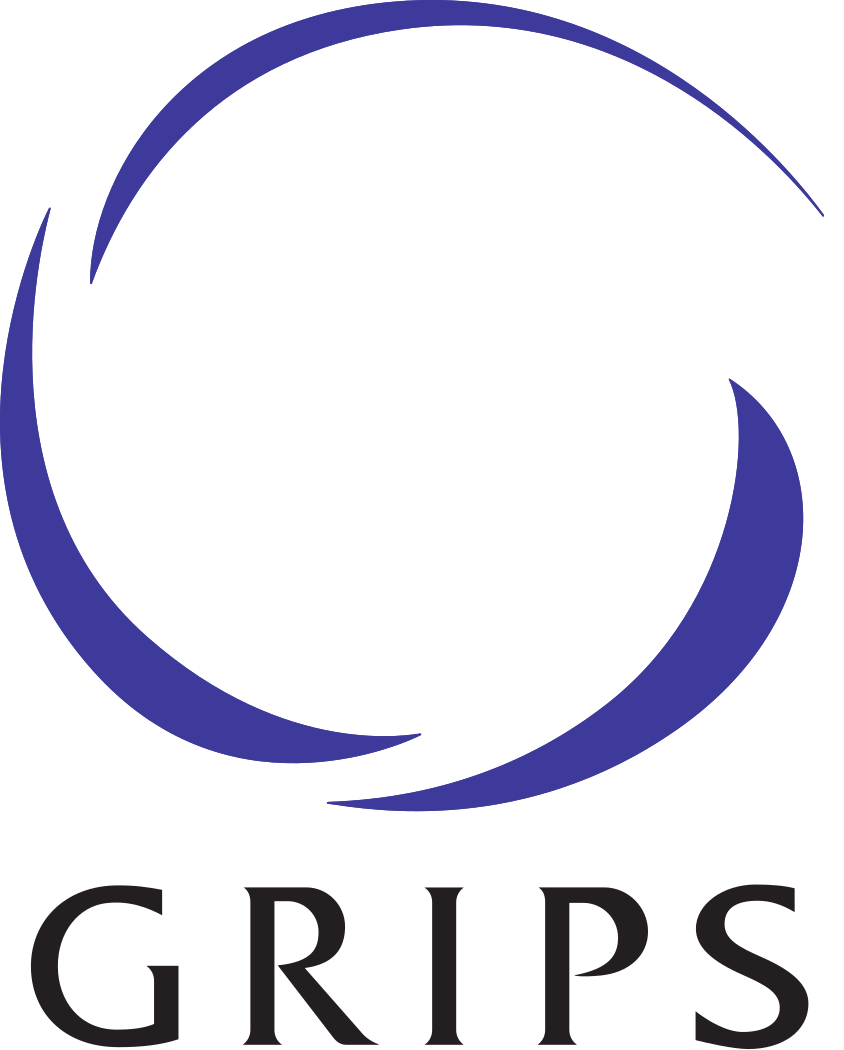
- Other name: GRIPS
- Former name: Graduate School of Policy Science (GSPS)
- Type: Public (national) graduate-only university
- Established: October 1, 1997 (28 years ago) (as GRIPS); 1977 (49 years ago) (as GSPS)
- President: Hiroko Ōta
- Total staff: 201 (including administrative and academic staff)
- Students: 379 (as of May 2024)
- Location: 7-22-1 Roppongi, Minato, Tokyo, 106-8677, Japan
- Campus: Urban
- Colors: Purple
- Website: www.grips.ac.jp/en/
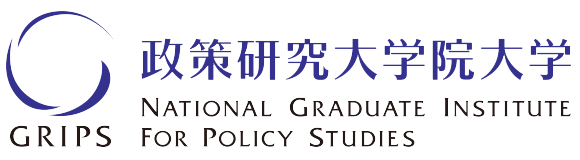

The National Graduate Institute for Policy Studies (政策研究大学院大学, Seisaku Kenkyū Daigakuin Daigaku; GRIPS) is a public graduate school in Minato, Tokyo. Funded by the Japanese government, it is the second smallest by enrollment of all the national universities in Japan.

The school offers graduate-level and executive education programs in security and international affairs, diplomacy, international development, economics, political science, disaster risk management, and science and technology policy, among others. Its current president is Hiroko Ōta, a former Japanese cabinet minister, who assumed office in September 2023. It is considered as one of the world's best public policy schools and Asia's leading institutions dedicated to policy and economics research.

== Overview ==
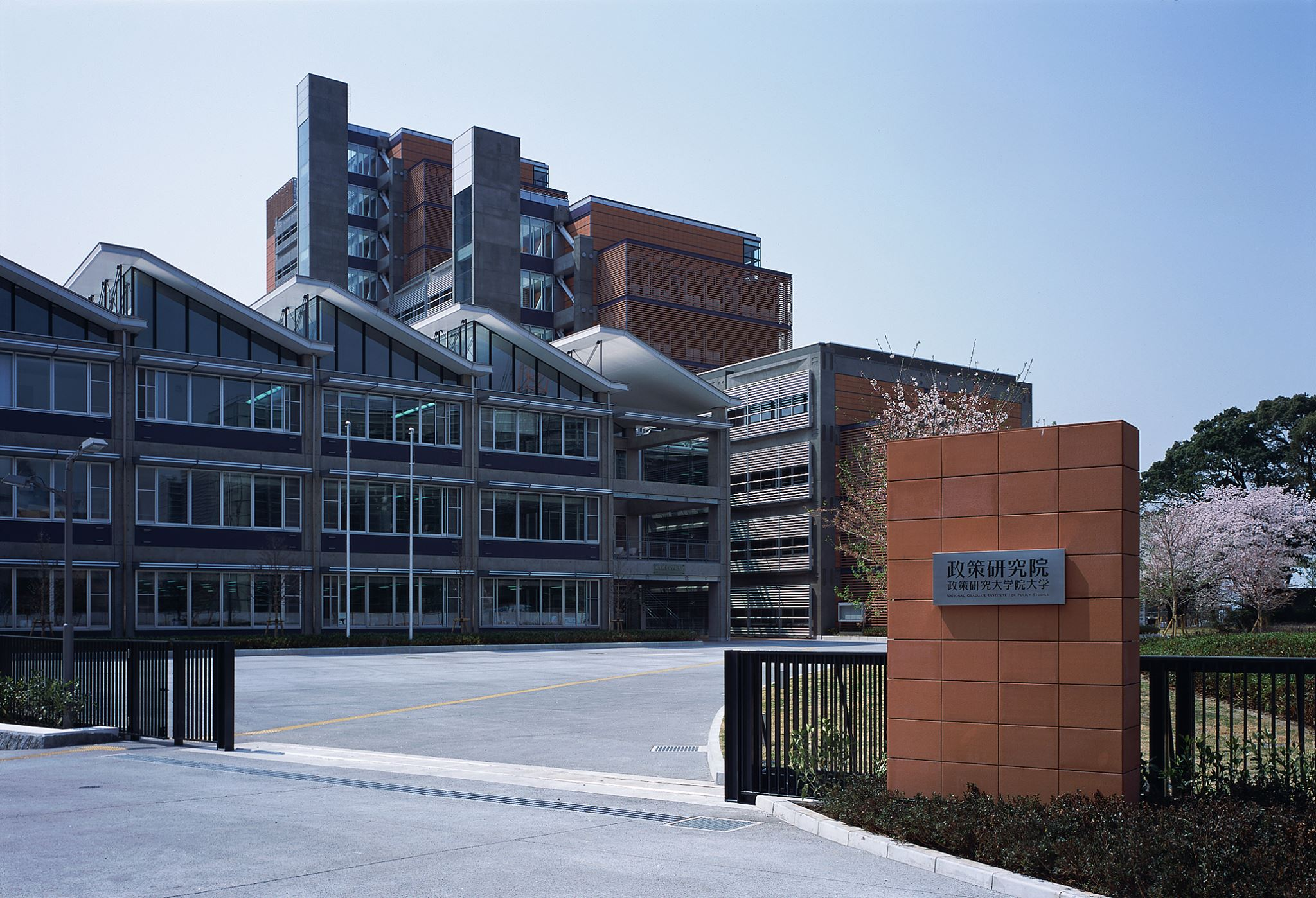
Facade of GRIPS's campus in Roppongi, Central Tokyo, c. 2022

Locally known as GRIPS, the National Graduate Institute for Policy Studies is a stand-alone graduate school with an attached research center and a global reach. Modeled after Harvard Kennedy School, Princeton School of Public and International Affairs and Johns Hopkins School of Advanced International Studies and spun off from Saitama University, GRIPS is composed of academics and practitioners with expertise in policy studies, economics, political science, and public administration. Its mission is to train future policy leaders and contribute to the betterment of democratic governance in Japan and the world.

Around 20% of the faculty and 60% of students are from overseas.

In November 2025, IDEAS ranked GRIPS as Asia's top public policy school and 10th best worldwide in terms of research outputs and citations. During the same period, the institute ranked second in economics among Japanese institutions and 11th in Asia.

== History ==
GRIPS has a history dating back to 1977, when the Graduate School of Policy Science (GSPS) was established at Saitama University. In 1997, GSPS became an independent academic institution and was renamed the National Graduate Institute for Policy Studies (GRIPS). Since then, the institute has expanded its programs and facilities.

Some of the key milestones in GRIPS's history include:

- 1999: GRIPS relocated to campus in Shinjuku Wakamatsu-cho, Tokyo
- 2000: Launch of domestic and international programs in public policy, development policy, regional policy, and cultural policy; Conferred first master's degree
- 2003: Conferred first doctoral degree
- 2004: Transitioned to national university corporation
- 2005: Relocation to a new campus in Roppongi, Tokyo
- 2013: Establishment of the GRIPS ALLIANCE, a network of partner institutions
- 2016: Establishment of GRIPS Fund
- 2020: Launch of the Public Policy Program (Master's International Cooperation Concentration)

== Campus ==
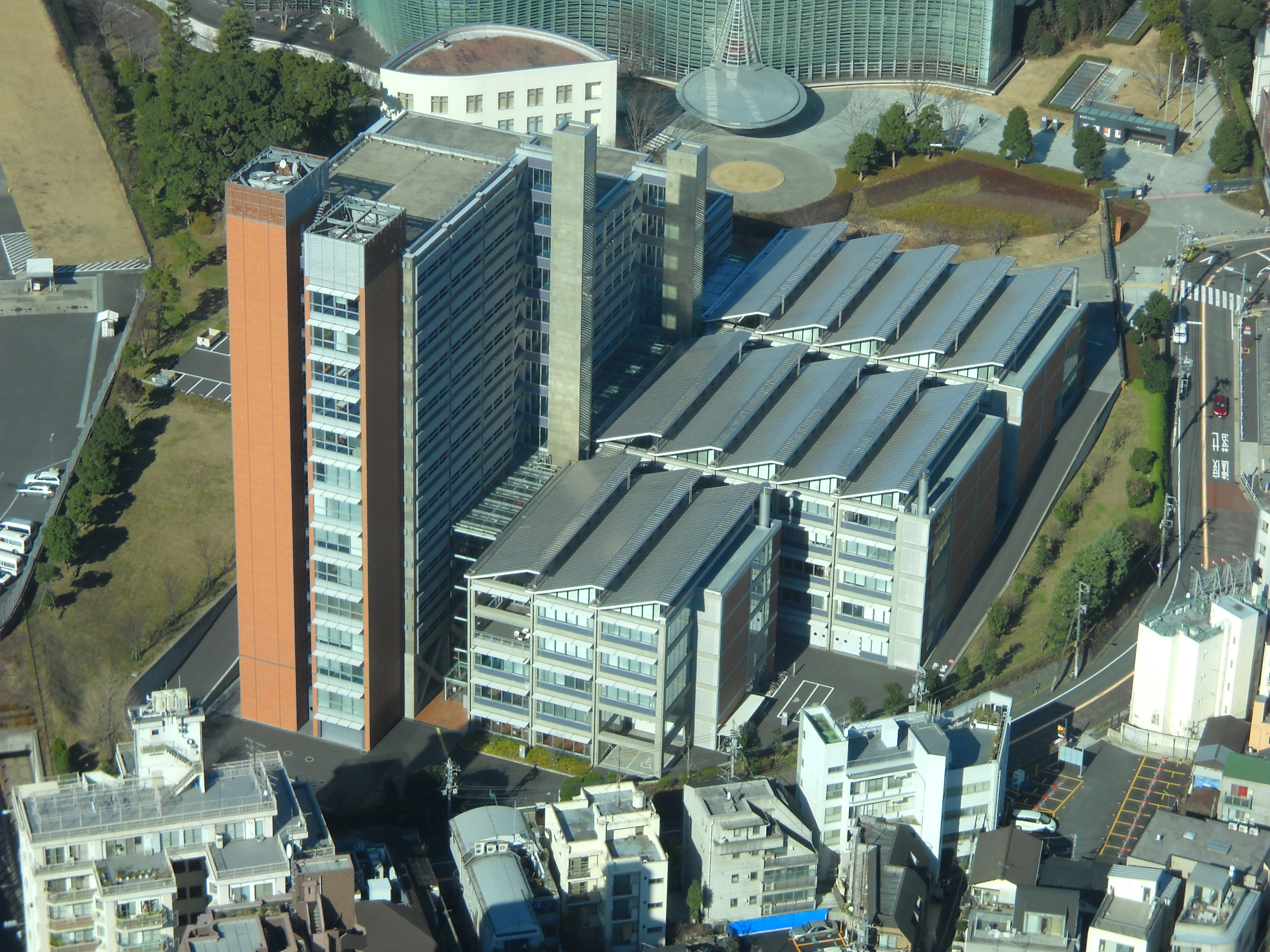
Panoramic view of the campus

Located in Roppongi, the campus is close to Nagatacho and Kasumigaseki, where the country's political and administrative offices, such as the National Diet of Japan, are located.

Its building was jointly designed by Yamashita Sekkei, the Richard Rogers Design Consortium, and the Ministry of Education, Culture, Sports, Science and Technology (MEXT). Construction was completed in February 2005 as the first Public-Private Partnership (PFI) project undertaken by the ministry.

The National Art Center, Tokyo is adjacent to the campus's current location. Before World War II, this area served as the garrison of the 3rd Infantry Regiment of the Imperial Japanese Army.

Before its relocation in 2005, GRIPS occupied the former site of the National Tax College in Shinjuku, Tokyo. The move coincided with the development of the former sites of the University of Tokyo's Institute of Industrial Science and the Institute of Physics.

== Academic programs ==
The institute offers graduate programs at both the Master's and Ph.D. levels:

Master's programs at GRIPS
Master’s (International)	Master’s (Domestic)
Young Leaders Program (School of Government and School of Local Governance); One-year Master’s Program of Public Policy; Two-year Master’s Program of Public Policy; Macroeconomic Policy; Public Finance; Disaster Management Policy; Economics, Planning and Public Policy; Graduate Program in Japanese Language and Culture; Maritime Safety and Security Policy Program	Public Policy; Development Policy; Cultural Policy; Intellectual Property; Urban Policy; Education Policy; Disaster Risk Management; Science, Technology and Innovation Policy

PhD programs at GRIPS
PhD (3-year)	PhD (5-year)
Public Policy (Doctor of Public Policy); Security and International Studies (PhD/Doctor of International Relations); Disaster Management; Science, Technology and Innovation Policy; Japanese Language and Culture	Policy Analysis Program; GRIPS Global Governance (G-Cube) Program

== Notable people ==
=== Faculty ===
- Fumio Hayashi: Professor emeritus
- Keisuke Iida: Former Dean of the Graduate School of Public Policy, University of Tokyo
- Haruhiko Kuroda: Professor, senior fellow (GRIPS Alliance); former governor of the Bank of Japan; former president of Asian Development Bank, former chief currency official of the Japanese Ministry of Finance
- Shinichi Kitaoka: Adjunct professor; former president of the Japan International Cooperation Agency
- Takehiko Nakao: Former president of the Asian Development Bank
- Hiroko Ōta: President of the university; Professor of economics; former Japanese cabinet minister of economic and fiscal policy
- Keijiro Otsuka: Professor emeritus
- Takashi Shiraishi: Professor emeritus
- Satryo Brodjonegoro: Visiting fellow; former minister of Ministry of Higher Education, Science, and Technology (Indonesia)
- Tetsushi Sonobe: Former vice president and professor; current dean and CEO of the Asian Development Bank Institute
- Akihiko Tanaka: President of the Japan International Cooperation Agency

=== Alumni ===
As of May 2023, GRIPS has over 6000 alumni, most of whom work for government agencies and international organizations all over the world. Its alumni network spans over 120 countries and includes heads of government, central bank governors, cabinet officials, top diplomats, and leaders of international organizations.

== Partner institutions ==
As of August 2024, GRIPS has partnerships with the following universities and institutions:

- Australia National University
- (Cambodia) Royal School of Administration
- (Egypt) The National Institute for Governance and Sustainable Development
- (Hungary) Corvinus University of Budapest
- (Indonesia) Universitas Brawijaya
- (Indonesia) Universitas Gadjah Mada
- Universitas Indonesia
- (South Korea) Korea University
- (South Korea) Korea Research Institute for Local Administration
- (Pakistan) National School of Public Policy
- Development Academy of the Philippines
- University of the Philippines Diliman
- (Taiwan) National Chi Nan University
- (Thailand) King Prajadhipok’s Institute
- (Thailand) Office of the Council of State
- (Thailand) Thammasat University
- (United States) McCourt School of Public Policy, Georgetown University

== See also ==
- Public policy school
- Harvard Kennedy School
