= Hiroko Ōta =

Japanese politician (born 1954)

- 大田 弘子
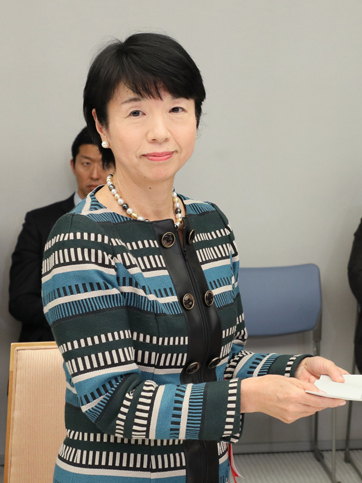
- Hiroko Ōta in 2017

Minister of State for Economic and Fiscal Policy
- In office 26 September 2006 – 2 August 2008
- Prime Minister: Shinzo Abe; Yasuo Fukuda
- Preceded by: Kaoru Yosano
- Succeeded by: Kaoru Yosano

Personal details
- Born: 2 February 1954 (age 72) Kagoshima, Japan
- Education: Hitotsubashi University

Hiroko Ōta (大田 弘子, Ōta Hiroko; born 2 February 1954 in Kagoshima, Kagoshima) is a Japanese politician, university president and a researcher of economics. Her academic specialties are national public finance and economic policy. She is a noted lecturer of public finance and is a senior professor at the National Graduate Institute for Policy Studies (GRIPS) in Tokyo.

Ōta served as the Japanese cabinet minister of economic policy, which is responsible for charging economic policy and public finance. Under Prime Minister Shinzo Abe, she served as the chair for the Council for Promotion of Regulatory Reform. In April 2014, Ōta was appointed to the position of chairwoman of the board by Mizuho Financial Group, Japan's second-largest financial services group.

On 1 September 2022, following the return of the previous President, Akihiko Tanaka, to the Japan International Cooperation Agency (JICA), she was appointed as President of the National Graduate Institute for Policy Studies.

== Career ==
- 1976: graduates from Hitotsubashi University
- 1993: assistant professor at Osaka University
- 1996: professor of economics at the National Graduate Institute for Policy Studies, (GRIPS) in Tokyo
- 2002: cabinet office counsellor
- 2006–2008: appointed to be Minister of State for Economic and Fiscal Policy under the Abe administration and proceeding Fukuda administration
- 2008: returns to GRIPS as a professor
- 2009–2011: GRIPS vice president
- 2022-: GRIPS President

Political offices
Preceded by Kaoru Yosano	Minister of State for Economic and Fiscal Policy of Japan; 2006–2008	Succeeded by Kaoru Yosano
