= Xu Yong (historian) =

Chinese historian

Xu Yong (Chinese: 徐勇; born September 1949) is a Chinese historian and professor at Peking University.

He was a member of the Japan-China Joint History Research Committee established by Chinese and Japanese governments in 2006.

Some of Xu's work is controversial. He has argued in research papers and symposiums that the issue of sovereignty over Okinawa is unsettled. His view is that the approval of the Qing Dynasty of China was needed when Japan abolished the Kingdom of Ryukyu and set up Okinawa Prefecture in 1879. A series of historical events are highlighted by Xu's argument, including

- the abolition of the kingdom by the Meiji government in 1879
- US control over Okinawa after World War II
- Okinawa's reversion to Japanese sovereignty from US occupation in 1972.

Xu's work supports China's right to claim Okinawa as part of the People's Republic of China.
