= Japan-China Joint History Research Committee =

Japan-China Joint History Research Committee (日中歴史共同研究) is a scholarly study group created by the governments of Japan and China. It is made up of prominent historians from both countries.

== History ==
In 2006, the Chinese and Japanese foreign ministers agreed to create a joint study group to try to find ways to clarify interpretations of history which are notably different. This agreement recognized that disputes about history have affected bilateral relations.

The first meeting was held in December 2006 at the Chinese Academy of Social Sciences in Beijing, with committee members meeting with Li Zhaoxing, Minister for Foreign Affairs of the People's Republic of China. The historians developed China-Japan joint study topics.

=== Disputes ===
Many areas of dispute were not resolved -- for example, in the final report,

"the Japanese insisted that Ryukyu was under effective control of the Satsuma domain from the 17th century and that this fact was known to China, while the Chinese persevered that Ryukyu was an independent state until 1879, when Ryukyu was annexed by Japan."

== List ==
=== Japanese members ===
- Sumio Hatano
- Yoshiaki Kawamoto
- Hideaki Kikuchi
- Shinichi Kitaoka, chairman
- Tomoyuki Kojima
- Tsuyoshi Kojima
- Kazuya Sakamoto
- Junichiro Shoji
- Kazuyuki Tsuruma
- Masayuki Yamauchi

=== Chinese members ===
- Bu Ping, chairman
- Jiang Lifeng
- Rong Weimu
- Tang Chongnan
- Tao Wenzhao
- Wang Jianlang
- Wang Xiaoqiu
- Wang Xinsheng
- Xu Yong
- Zang Yunhu
