= Shinichi Kitaoka =

Japanese political scientist

- 北岡 伸一
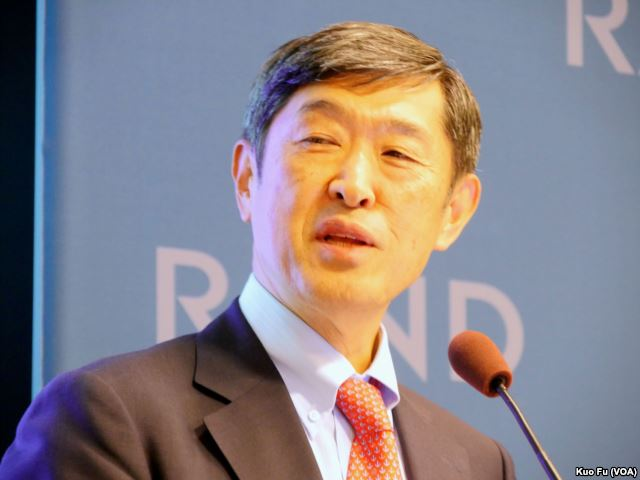

President of the Japan International Cooperation Agency
- In office 1 October 2015 – 31 March 2022
- Preceded by: Akihiko Tanaka
- Succeeded by: Akihiko Tanaka

President of the International University of Japan
- In office 2012 – September 30, 2015
- Preceded by: Masakatsu Mori
- Succeeded by: Kimio Kase

Personal details
- Born: April 20, 1948 (age 78) Yoshino, Nara, Japan
- Education: University of Tokyo

Shinichi Kitaoka (北岡 伸一, Kitaoka Shin'ichi; born 20 April 1948) is a Japanese political scientist. He has held many roles such as the president of the Japan International Cooperation Agency (JICA), president of the International University of Japan, professor at Japan's GRIPS-Tokyo School of Security and International Studies, and Japanese ambassador to the United Nations. His area of expertise is the history of Japanese politics and diplomacy, as a political scientist and a historian.

== Early life ==
Kitaoka was born in Yoshino, Nara Prefecture. His family owned a sake brewing business and both his father and grandfather had served as the mayor of Yoshino. His great uncle was Juitsu Kitaoka, economist and former official of the Ministry of Labor.

Kitaoka graduated with a B.L. in June 1971 and received his Ph.D. of Law from the University of Tokyo in September 1976. While studying at the University of Tokyo he lived at the all-male dormitory Wakeijuku.

== Career ==
Kitaoka took a lecturership at Rikkyo University; he became a full professor there in 1985. In 1997, he moved to a position at the University of Tokyo.

In 2004, he was appointed as Japan's ambassador and deputy permanent representative to the United Nations, a position he held until 2006 when he returned to academia.

In 2006-2010, Kitaoka was the Japanese chair of the Japan-China Joint History Research Committee. Among other topics, the committee investigated the Nanking Massacre. From 2009-2010, he chaired a Ministry of Foreign Affairs committee on the so-called Secret Agreements between the U.S. and Japan on the introduction of nuclear weapons into Japanese territory.

Kitaoka was the Deputy Chairman of the Advisory Panel on Reconstruction of the Legal Basis for Security, an advisory panel to Prime Minister Abe on the possibility of re-interpreting constitutional provisions to allow for collective self-defense.

=== Awards ===
In 2011 he was awarded the Medal with Purple Ribbon for his academic contributions.

=== Publications ===
Japanese language

- Nishitaiheiyō rengō no susume: Nihon no "atarashii chiseigaku". Tokyo: Tōyō Keizai. 2021.
- Meiji Ishin no imi. Tokyo: Shinchosha. 2020.
- Sekai chizu o yominaosu: Kyōryoku to kinkō no chiseigaku. Tokyo: Shinchosha. 2019.
- Nihonseijishi: Gaikō to kenryoku zōho-ban. Tokyo: Yuhikaku. 2017.
- Kanryō-sei toshite no Nipponrikugun. Tokyo: Chikuma Shobo. 2012.
- Jimintō: Seiken tō no 38-nen. Tokyo: Chuokoron-Shinsha. 2008.
- Kokuren no seiji rikigaku: Nihon wa doko ni iru no ka. Tokyo: Chuokoron-Shinsha. 2007.
- Kiyosawa Kiyoshi zōho-ban: Gaikō hyōron no unmei. Tokyo: Chuokoron-Shinsha. 2004.

English translations

- A Western Pacific Union: Japan's New Geopolitical Strategy. Tokyo: Japan Publishing Industry Foundation for Culture. 2023.
- From Party Politics to Militarism in Japan, 1924–1941. Boulder, CO: Lynne Rienner. 2021.
- Gotō Shinpei, Statesman of Vision: Research, Public Health, and Development. Tokyo: Japan Publishing Industry Foundation for Culture. 2021.
- The Political History of Modern Japan: Foreign Relations and Domestic Politics. London: Routledge. 2018.
- Self-Respect and Independence of Mind: The Challenge of Fukuzawa Yukichi. Tokyo: Japan Publishing Industry Foundation for Culture. 2017.
