= Japan Overseas Cooperation Volunteers =

Japan Overseas Cooperation Volunteers (青年海外協力隊, seinen kaigai kyōryokutai) is a government system for dispatching young Japanese volunteers overseas operated by Japan International Cooperation Agency (JICA). The program is similar to the U.S. Peace Corps, and includes volunteers in wide range of fields such as agriculture, forestry, fisheries, education, health, and more than 120 technical fields. Since 1965, more than 30,000 Japanese volunteers have been dispatched to more than 80 developing countries in Asia, Middle East, Africa, Central and South America, the Caribbean, and Oceania. The recruitment is held on April to May and October to November annually. Japanese citizens aged from 20 to 39 are eligible to apply. It is commonly known by the initialism JOCV.

== History ==
The initiative was started in 1957 after Japan joined the Colombo Plan in 1954. After the Peace Corps was established by the United States in 1961, the JOCV was established in 1965. The first volunteers were dispatched to Laos in Southeast Asia.

Later, other related projects were started. The Senior Volunteers (シニア海外ボランティア, senior kaigai volunteer) which consists of elderly citizens was established in 1990; the Youth Volunteers for Nikkei Communities (日系社会青年ボランティア, nikkei syakai seinen volunteer) and the Senior Volunteers for Nikkei Communities (日系社会シニア・ボランティア, nikkei syakai senior volunteer) which target Japanese emigrants in Latin America was established in 1996. As of 2000, the total number of JOCV was over 20,000. As of July 2013, the total number of JOCV was 38,300, serving in 88 countries.

== Activities ==
The JOCV work with local organizations such as government offices, town offices, and schools. The JOCV's term is 2 years, but can be extended by 1 year if needed.

=== Countries ===
As of July 2013, the JOCV were working in 71 countries and they used to work in 88 countries. The majority of JOCV work in Asia, Africa, and Latin America, though many work in the Middle East and some parts of Eastern Europe as well.

Major countries in each region were worked by JOCV and the total number of JOCV.
| | Asia | | Middle East | | Africa | | Latin America | | Oceania | | Europe | |
| | Countries | Numbers | Countries | Numbers | Countries | Numbers | Countries | Numbers | Countries | Numbers | Countries | Numbers |
|---|---|---|---|---|---|---|---|---|---|---|---|---|
| 1st | Philippines | 1,526 | Morocco | 927 | Malawi | 1,599 | Honduras | 1,140 | Papua New Guinea | 592 | Bulgaria | 250 |
| 2nd | Malaysia | 1,275 | Syria | 565 | Kenya | 1,510 | Paraguay | 1,069 | Fiji | 493 | Hungary | 135 |
| 3rd | Bangladesh | 1,168 | Jordan | 499 | Tanzania | 1,453 | Bolivia | 850 | Samoa | 473 | Romania | 116 |
| 4th | Nepal | 1,093 | Tunisia | 349 | Zambia | 1,290 | Guatemala | 592 | Tonga | 393 | Poland | 103 |
| 5th | Sri Lanka | 868 | Egypt | 220 | Ghana | 1,183 | Dominican Republic | 563 | Solomon Islands | 344 | Turkey | 2 |
| Total | 19 countries | 11,156 | 6 countries | 2,628 | 26 countries | 12,404 | 22 countries | 8,244 | 10 countries | 3,262 | 5 countries | 606 |

=== Technical Fields ===
There are more than 120 technical fields in 8 sectors. As of July 2013, the Education, Culture & Sports sector constitute about half of JOCVs who are working. And also, the sector constitute 39% of a cumulative total of JOCVs. The Agriculture, Forestry & Fisheries sector and the Manufacturing & Mechanical Training sector constituted a large share of JOCVs, but now they constitute less than 10%.

Major technical fields in each sector were worked by JOCV and the total number of JOCV.
| | Fields | Numbers | Fields | Numbers | Fields | Numbers | Fields | Numbers |
| | Public administration | | Public works & Public Utilities | | Agriculture, Forestry & Fisheries | | Manufacturing & Mechanical Training | |
|---|---|---|---|---|---|---|---|---|
| 1st | Community development | 2,595 | Telecommunication | 558 | Vegetable farming | 1,379 | Auto maintenance | 1,316 |
| 2nd | Computer technology | 1,380 | Construction | 555 | Rice growing | 681 | Electronics | 758 |
| 3rd | Statistics | 74 | Civil engineering | 519 | Animal husbandry | 652 | Machine tool | 234 |
| 4th | Administrative service | 36 | Surveying | 384 | Animal health | 404 | Pottery | 222 |
| Total | 4,106 | | 2,652 | | 5,481 | | 3,843 | |
| | Business Management & Tourism | | Education, Culture & Sports | | Health & Medicine | | Social Welfare | |
| 1st | Marketing research | 162 | Science & Mathematics education | 2,584 | Nursing | 1,587 | Special education | 575 |
| 2nd | Tourism | 135 | Japanese language education | 1,807 | Infection & HIV/AIDS control | 576 | Social work | 164 |
| 3rd | Quality control | 34 | Primary education | 1,288 | Midwifery | 506 | Industrial health & safety | 117 |
| 4th | Business management | 4 | Youth activity | 1,063 | Public health nursing | 452 | Welfare equipment | 22 |
| Total | 337 | | 14,855 | | 5,173 | | 880 | |

== Recruitment ==
Japanese citizens aged from 20 to 39 are eligible for the application. The number of applicants peaked at 11,832 each year in 1994. However, as of April 2011, the number of applicants reached a nadir at only 1,351 each half-year because Tōhoku earthquake and Arab Spring effected and the government cut benefits last year.

First screening

The screening run the following areas on paper exam.

- Technological skills
- Language skills
- Health

Second screening

The screening run in Tokyo and some local cities.

- Interview – It include a practical exam if it is required.
- Health – If it is required.

Even if one passes the required technical examination, he or she can sometimes be rejected, because his or her technical backgrounds might be judged not to match for any requests from the countries of any choices. Therefore, there are some cases of being hired after some repeated examinations. There are also some other cases of hiring applicants of low technical capabilities, or rejecting those of high technical capabilities.

In terms of health check, the required medical standard is strict because serious health problems can occur in developing countries to even one who can live a healthy life in Japan. The required medical standard depends on what country they are dispatched to, because the medical levels vary from country to country.

The second screening result has 3 status 'passed', 'rejected', and 'registered'. As previously explained, some of applicants with high technical capability and without matching for requests can be 'registered'. They can be promoted to be 'passed' when some successful applicants turn the requests down to leave a hole, or some countries make more requests out of the recruitment period.

== Training ==
If applicants passes the second screening, they will start to spend 65 days training as JOCV members in either of 2 training centers: one in Komagane City, Nagano Prefecture and another in Nihonmatsu City, Fukushima Prefecture. Which training center they are assigned to depends on what country they are going to be dispatched to. If they join JOCV after leaving their own offices, the period of unemployment benefit payments can be expanded of the day when they start training.

Basic Trainings

- Radio Calisthenics and Hoisting of the National Flags in the Early Morning
- Before Lunch: Learning each languages of the countries where they are going to be dispatched to
- Afternoon: Lecture of country studies, cross-cultural understandings, health managements, and emergency procedures

(vaccination times – once a week)

Food costs and lodging expenses are free while training. As charges of courses, 50,000 yen for one month is also supplied. The trainers are allowed to go out of the training centers after evening of Mon-Sat and on Sunday, but staying out overnight is allowed only on Sat-Sun. The volunteers are divided into 4 groups by the timing of dispatch. 1st group members are dispatched on June, 2nd group on September, 3rd group on December, and 4th group on March.

== See also ==
- Japan International Cooperation Agency
- Peace Corps
- Voluntary Service Overseas
