= JICA Research Institute =

Japanese research institute

Coordinates: 35.69442°N 139.73127°E

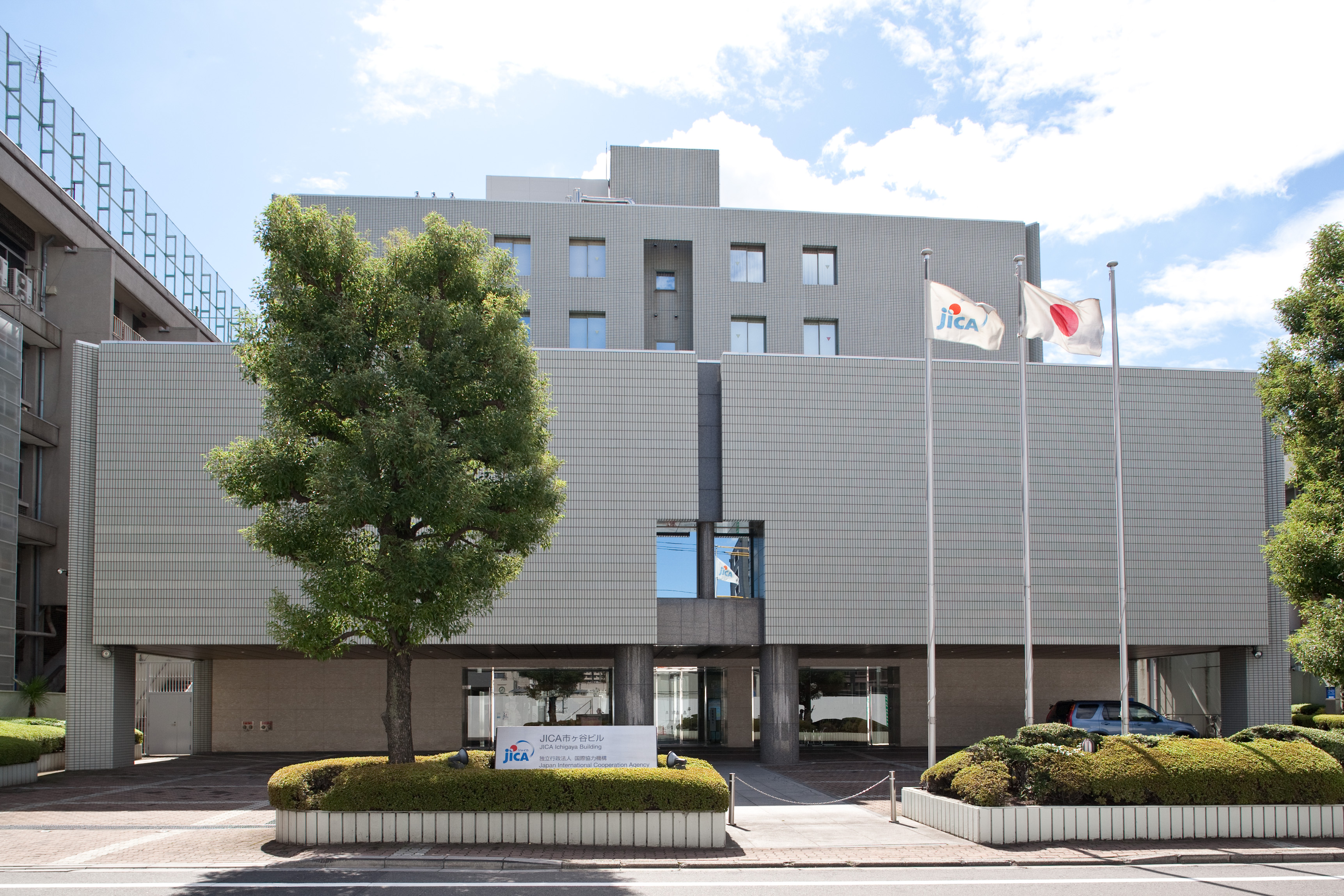
JICA市ヶ谷ビル

The JICA Research Institute (JICA-RI) (JICA研究所 Jaika Kenkyujo) is a research organization based in Tokyo, Japan. JICA-RI was established as a research wing of the Japan International Cooperation Agency (JICA) on October 1, 2008. In the University of Pennsylvania's 2014 Global Go To Think Tanks Report, JICA-RI is ranked at the highest in the category of international development among institutions in Japan, which is followed by other institutions such as Institute of Developing Economies, JETRO (IDE-JETRO), Japan Institute of International Affairs (JIIA), and Global Industrial and Social Progress Research Institute (GISPRI).

== Overview ==
JICA-RI, established as a part of JICA, aims at contributing to global development strategies by implementing policy-oriented, academically solid studies that address the important issues faced by developing countries. The role of JICA-RI is stipulated in the Act of the Incorporated Administrative Agency - Japan International Cooperation Agency (Act No. 136, 2002), as “to implement study and research necessary for JICA’s activities.” JICA-RI is based in JICA Ichigaya Building in Shinjuku-ward of Tokyo, Japan.

== History ==
JICA-RI was established on October 1, 2008, when the new JICA was launched as a result of merger of two existing institutions; former JICA which had been executing mainly technical cooperation and grant aid projects, and a part of JBIC (the Japan Bank for International Cooperation), which had been in charge of concessional yen loans. JICA-RI supersedes and strengthens the research capabilities of the former JICA and JBIC.

== Organization ==
JICA-RI has about 20 research fellows, and headed by a director general and a deputy director general.
Director General: Ichiro TAMBO (October 2014-)
Deputy Director General: Naohiro KITANO
Former Directors

- Keiichi TSUNEKAWA (2008-2011)
- Akio HOSONO (2011-2013)
- Hiroshi KATO (2013-2014)

== Research Strategy ==
According to its website JICA-RI has four research areas: peace and development, growth and poverty reduction, environment and development/climate change, and aid strategies.

JICA-RI is the only research institution in Japan that is affiliated with a development agency, thus it has the advantage of access to development activities in the field and on the ground.

JICA-RI intends to implement research by networking with other research institutions, as it stated in its website as “As a research institute affiliated with a development agency, JICA-RI's work is both policy- and operations-oriented, carried out together with various operational and academic organizations and other professionals committed to international development.” JICA-RI has research partnership with the Brookings Institution, Center for Strategic and International Studies, Initiative for Policy Dialogue, French Development Agency, World Bank, and more.

== Publications ==
JICA-RI publishes working papers, which report findings ongoing or completed research.

The outcome of the researches at JICA-RI is published in a number of reports and books. Some are available from the institution's website, while many titles are published by major academic publishing companies such as the Palgrave Macmillan, The Oxford University Press, Springer Publishing, the Brookings Institution, the Columbia University Press and more.

== Researchers ==
Sakiko Fukuda-Parr（Distinguished Fellow）
Surin Pitsuwan （Distinguished Fellow）

== See also ==
- Japan International Cooperation Agency
