= Akihiko Tanaka =

Japanese scholar

- 田中 明彦
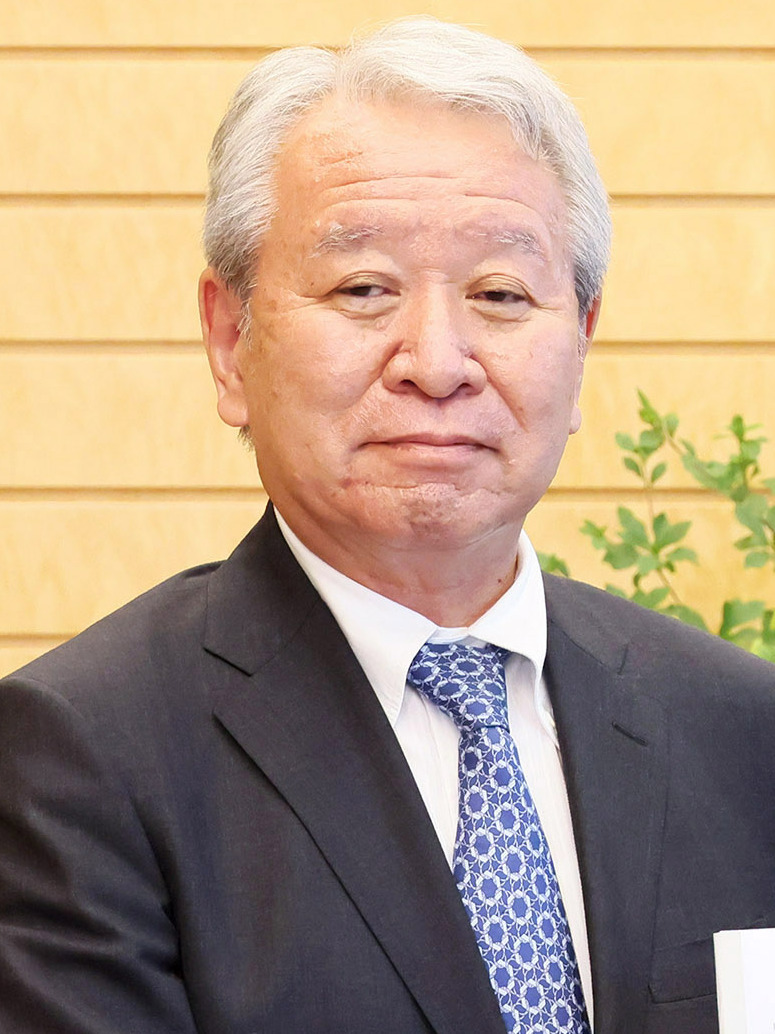

President of the Japan International Cooperation Agency
- Incumbent
- Assumed office April 2022
- Preceded by: Shinichi Kitaoka
- In office April 2012 – September 2015
- Preceded by: Sadako Ogata
- Succeeded by: Shinichi Kitaoka

Personal details
- Born: August 7, 1954 (age 72) Shiki, Saitama, Japan
- Education: University of Tokyo; Massachusetts Institute of Technology

Akihiko Tanaka (田中 明彦, Tanaka Akihiko; born 7 August 1954) is a Japanese international relations scholar who serves as president of the Japan International Cooperation Agency since April 2022. He is specializing in theories of international systems, contemporary international relations in East Asia, Japan–United States relations and China–Japan relations. He was also the president of the National Graduate Institute for Policy Studies.

Tanaka was a professor of international politics at The University of Tokyo's Institute for Advanced Studies on Asia from 1990 to 2012 and from 2015 to 2017, and served a previous term as president of JICA from 2012 to 2015. He served in various advisory panels commissioned by the Japanese government.

== Early life and academic career ==
Tanaka was born in Shiki, Saitama, in August 1954. He obtained his bachelor's degree in international relations at the University of Tokyo in 1977 and Ph.D. in political science at the Massachusetts Institute of Technology in 1981. Soon after his graduation, he joined the Research Institute for Peace and Security (RIPS) as a researcher, and in 1983 he started lecturing at the University of Tokyo.

Tanaka's academic research has been interdisciplinary, comprising theoretical essays, historical description, and computer programs designed to analyze and predict developments in international politics.

During his studies at MIT, Tanaka was influenced by professors Lucian Pye and Hayward Alker. Combining China studies and computer programs, he produced research on the negotiating process of the Treaty of Peace and Friendship between Japan and China (concluded in 1978), and a computer program named CHINA_WATCHER. Underlying the program was a decision-making model that assumed that both the decision-makers' preexisting worldview and precedent for current situation constitute the basis of their decisions. Tanaka incorporated findings derived from this program in his PhD dissertation, "Chinese International Conflict Behavior, 1949-1978".

Having returned to Japan in 1981, Tanaka joined the Research Institute for Peace and Security (RIPS), where he was mainly in charge of editing an annual report, "Asian Security." Influenced by the work of Professors Inoki Masamichi and Kosaka Masataka, then two of Japan's most prominent scholars of international politics, Tanaka—who had been mostly occupied with theoretical work and computer programming until then—came to acknowledge that analysis of current affairs was an "important area of work for scholars of international politics." In the summer of 1982, as the Textbook Problem came to strain the relations between Japan and China, Tanaka wrote a paper examining the reasons behind China's vocal objection to Japanese textbooks.

Around the same time, Tanaka had collaborated with Professor Kumon Shumpei in researching the world system as a unit of analysis. In their work, they argued that during the 19th and 20th century, three "social games" emerged, developed and declined in the following order: power game, wealth game, and knowledge game. Later, Tanaka developed this paper into the book Sekai shisutemu [The World System] (Tokyo: University of Tokyo Press, 1989).

In 1994, Tanaka received the Ushiba Fellowship and spent a year at St. Antony College, Oxford, where he dedicated most of his time to the manuscript of a book speculating on the direction of the contemporary world system, Atarashii chūsei: 21-seiki no sekai shisutemu (Tokyo: Nikkei Keizai Shimbun Shuppansha, 1996), and translated as The New Middle Ages: The World System in the 21st Century (Tokyo: The International House of Japan, 2002). In the book, he draws on Hedley Bull's new medievalism and Robert Keohane's and Joseph Nye's complex interdependence, and classifies the world order into three spheres (new medieval, modernization, and chaotic; he later changed their names to the liberal, realist, and fragile, respectively). Tanaka argues that while every part of the world system moves toward the first sphere of "new medievalism", all three spheres will characterize the world system for the foreseeable future.

Among Tanaka's other publications are numerous books and articles on world politics and security issues in Japanese and English, including Ni-Chū kankei 1945-1990 [Japan-China Relations 1945-2000] (Tokyo: University of Tokyo Press, 1991); Anzen hoshō: Sengo 50-nen no mosaku [Security: Searching 50 Years after the War] (Tokyo: Yomiuri Shimbunsha, 1997); Ajia no naka no Nihon (Tokyo: NTT Shuppan, 2007), and translated as Japan in Asia: Post-Cold-War Diplomacy (Tokyo: Japan Publishing Industry Foundation for Culture, 2017); An East Asian Community and the United States co-edited with Ralph A. Cossa (Washington, D.C.: Center for Strategic and International Studies, 2007), and "The Yasukuni Issue and Japan's International Relations" in East Asia's Haunted Present: Historical Memories and the Resurgence of Nationalism, edited by Hasegawa Tsuyoshi and Togo Katsuhiko (Westport, CT: Praeger, 2008).

Since 1994, Tanaka has been developing the database "The World and Japan", which stores over 12,000 historical documents dealing with Japan's domestic and international politics in the 19th, 20th, and 21st centuries. The database's website registers about 150,000 hits per month.

== Administrative, professional, and advisory career ==
Tanaka served in various administrative roles at the University of Tokyo: as the Director of the Institute for Advanced Studies on Asia (2002-2006) and as Vice President (2009-2011). In the latter position, he was in charge of its international affairs; during his term, the university joined the G-30 program and established degree programs in English catered to both Japanese and international students, including the PEAK program at the Komaba Campus. In 2012, Tanaka became the president of the Japan International Cooperation Agency (JICA), succeeding Sadako Ogata. Upon the Cabinet's approval of Tanaka's appointment to the role, Japan's Foreign Minister Koichiro Genba called Tanaka "a prominent scholar in international politics who is highly acclaimed in the world as well as in Japan. His works and activities encompass wide-ranging fields, including diplomacy, security, politics and economics, and he has been involved in making various proposals to the government." Among the many projects the agency oversaw, Tanaka was involved in the comprehensive peace agreement signed in March 2014 between the Philippine government and the Moro Islamic Liberation Front (MILF). The agreement ended two decades of negotiation, and JICA soon began implementing several "quick impact" projects in the area to improve the prospects of a lasting peace in the region.

Tanaka stepped down as president of JICA in September 2015. He then served as president of the National Graduate Institute for Policy Studies from 2017 to 2022. He was reappointed president of JICA in April 2022, succeeding Shinichi Kitaoka.

In addition to his administrative and professional capacities, Tanaka has served in various advisory roles, such as the East Asia Vision Group, an advisory panel for the ASEAN+3 summit (1999 to 2001), as well as several government and semi-governmental advisory panels, including the Council of Defense-Strategic Studies (2001), the Advisory Group on International Cooperation for Peace (2002), and the Council on Security and Defense Capability (2009). He was also involved in drafting policy recommendations such as "Japan's New Security Strategy: Multilayered and Cooperative Security Strategy" (2008), and the "Toward a Greater Alliance: A Policy Proposal of the Mt. Fuji Dialogue Special Task Force" (2017). In addition to advisory roles in Japan, Tanaka has advised international organizations such as the United Nations Development Program (UNDP).

== Media commentary ==
Tanaka occasionally contributes to media outlets, such as the Nikkei Asian Review, Mainichi Shimbun, the Yomiuri Shimbun, and the Asahi Shimbun.

== Honors ==
Medal with Purple Ribbon in 2012 for academic achievements.
