= GRIPS-Security and International Studies Program, Tokyo =

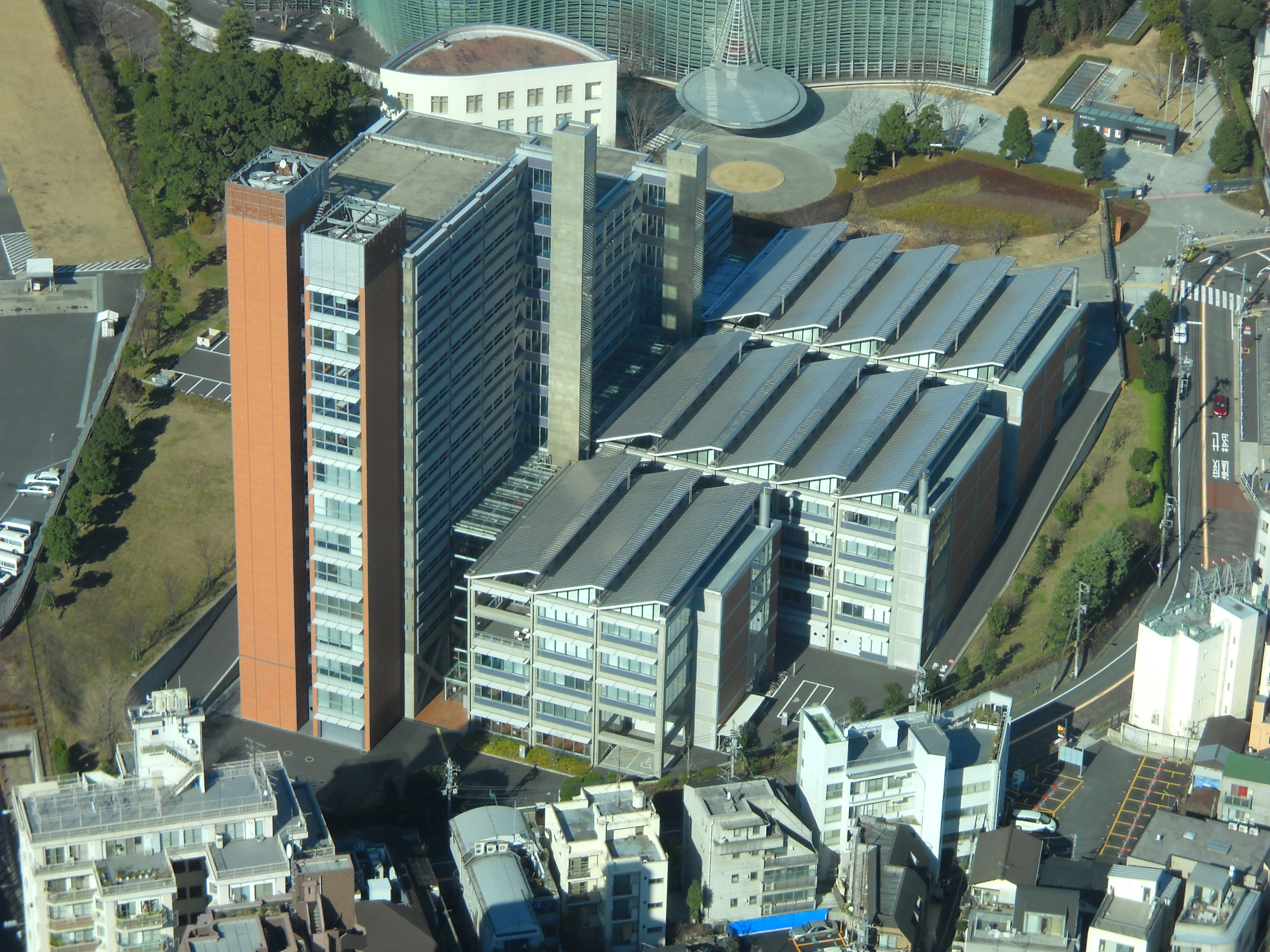
The School of Security and International Studies is in the same National Graduate Institute for Policy Studies building in Roponggi, Tokyo, where all other degree programs offered by the institute are housed.

The Security and International Studies Program (SISP) is an advanced academic program on international relations and strategic studies under the National Graduate Institute for Policy Studies (GRIPS), an elite and highly selective graduate school based in Minato, Tokyo, Japan. SISP was astablished in partnership with the Ministry of Defense and the Ministry of Foreign Affairs of Japan, to equip scholars with academic and practical skills for understanding and solving security and foreign policy issues. Located at the heart of Tokyo, the program offers advanced degree at the Ph.D. level. GRIPS combines a broad interdisciplinary curriculum with an applied research focus and a commitment to international, state, and regional policy issues. English is the primary medium of instruction.

The program conducts in-depth research on historical and contemporary strategic studies and foreign policy matters, and engage in International relations theory as well as policy debates with students, faculty members and outside specialists. Field trips, seminars, academic conferences and collaborative events common at the school are another important means of enhancing the scholars' understanding of subject matters related to East Asia and Pacific Affairs, and International Politics in general.

== Program Design ==
The school operates on a four-term calendar with a 16-week Fall Term, 8-week Winter Term, 16-week Spring Term, and 8-week Summer Term. In the first year, students are required to undertake course work and earn a minimum of 14 credits from the courses and tutorials. The Security and International Studies PhD Program at GRIPS Tokyo is completed in three to five years. By the end of the first year, students are expected to pass three Written Qualifying Examinations (QE), submit a dissertation prospectus, and pass in one Oral Qualifying Examination which is doctoral dissertation prospectus defense. After completing all four Qualifying Examinations, students can start writing a dissertation to complete it by the end of the third year.

=== Curriculum (as of April 2012) ===
==== I Theoretical courses ====
- Advanced International Political Economy
- Strategic Studies Research Methodologies
- Advanced International Relations
- Advanced International Security Studies
- Comparative Politics
- Advanced International Political Economy of Money and Finance

==== II Regional courses ====
- International Relations in East Asia
- American Foreign Policy
- Diplomatic History of Modern Japan
- Politics and Diplomacy in Postwar Japan
- Chinese Foreign Policy
- Advanced Political Economy of Modern Japan
- Advanced International Relations of the Asia Pacific
- Advanced Political Economy of East Asia
- Advanced International Relations in Europe

==== III Policy courses ====
- International Situation and Japanese National Security Policy
- Non-Traditional Security (advanced)
- Japan’s ODA Policy (advanced)

==== IV Foundation Courses ====
- Security and International Studies Dissertation Seminar (Core Course)

== Admissions Policy ==
The School of Security and International Studies at GRIPS has a very selective admission process. The school mainly produces researchers in the field of international politics, strategic and security studies, and foreign policy analysis. The school also produces competent public administrators and practitioners with professional expertise in diplomacy and foreign policy. To deepen students' academic credentials, many research opportunities are offered, such as joint research with supervisors and colleagues, conference participation and presentations, as well as financial support through scholarships, TA/RA, tuition waiver, etc.

GRIPS seeks to cultivate scholars and professionals equipped with the skills to identify real security and foreign policy issues, for the thorough analysis of policies and development of practical solutions, including policy formulation and evaluation. It also seeks to produce high-level researchers and experts in policy studies, as well as policy leaders for international organizations, national governments, and societies worldwide

The program seeks:

- To admit students who are both capable and enthusiastic about acquiring the skills needed to analyze security and international political issues from an academic standpoint.
- To admit not only a significant number of aspiring researchers on an ongoing basis, but also talented young and middle-echelon administrators and professionals from multilateral institutions, defense and foreign ministries of countries, and non-government organizations who will spearhead international policy-making worldwide, including in Japan.
- To admit a significant number of foreign students from all over the world.
- To admit students of diverse backgrounds without regard to their field of undergraduate specialization.

== Scholarships ==
Obtaining a scholarship allocated through GRIPS by various sponsoring organizations is a common way to finance a PhD in International Relations Degree at GRIPS Tokyo School of Security and International Studies. Applicants do not need to apply for a scholarship or funding separately. The specific scholarship will be determined by GRIPS based on eligibility requirements imposed by the scholarship providers. Scholarships are allocated on an extremely competitive basis and that only a limited number of scholarships is available.

The scholarships cover Application, admission and tuition fees, Round-trip economy-class air tickets between the students' home country and Japan, and a monthly stipend. The stipend is intended to cover living expenses such as food, clothing, and other daily necessaries, as well as insurance, and other miscellaneous related to study in Tokyo. The stipend is fixed and cannot be increased to cover family members.

== Campus ==
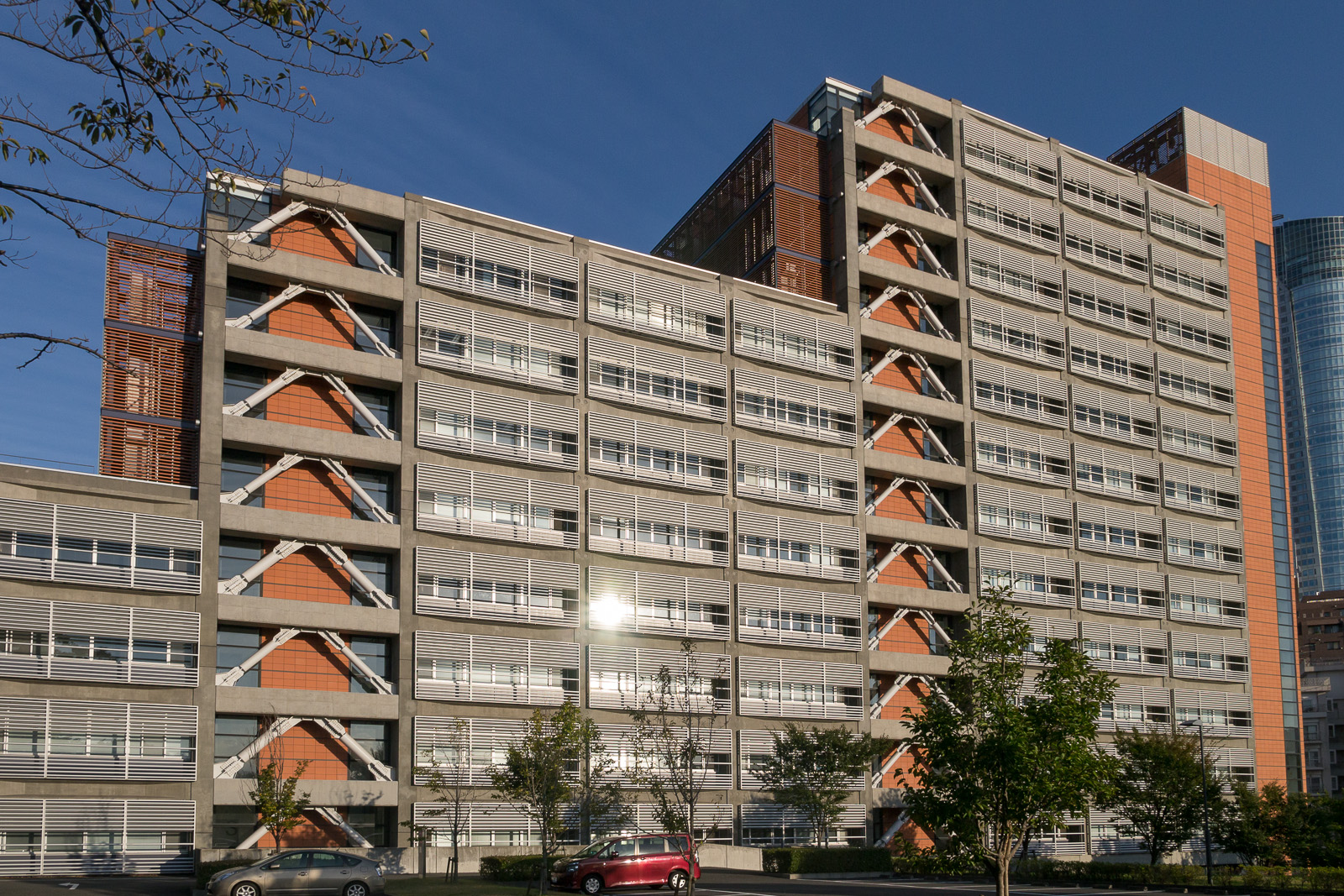
The Campus in central Tokyo.

The Security and International Studies Program is housed in the Roppongi Campus of GRIPS. Designed by the Yamashita Sekkei and Richard Rogers Partnership, the campus opened its doors in the spring of 2005. The campus is located in Roppongi, close to the Japanese Diet and government ministries, as well as headquarters of major Japanese and foreign multinational corporations and multilateral institutions.
