= Japan International Cooperation Agency =

Governmental agency

- Abbreviation: JICA
- Formation: August 1, 2003; 23 years ago
- Type: Incorporated Administrative Agency
- Legal status: Active
- Purpose: Official development assistance
- Headquarters: 1F–6F Ninbancho Building Center, Chiyoda, Tokyo, Japan
- Region served: Worldwide
- Official language: Japanese; English (secondary)
- President: Akihiko Tanaka
- Affiliations: Development Assistance Committee; Organisation for Economic Co-operation and Development
- Budget: ¥1.478 billion
- Staff: 1,845 (March 2015)
- Website: jica.go.jp

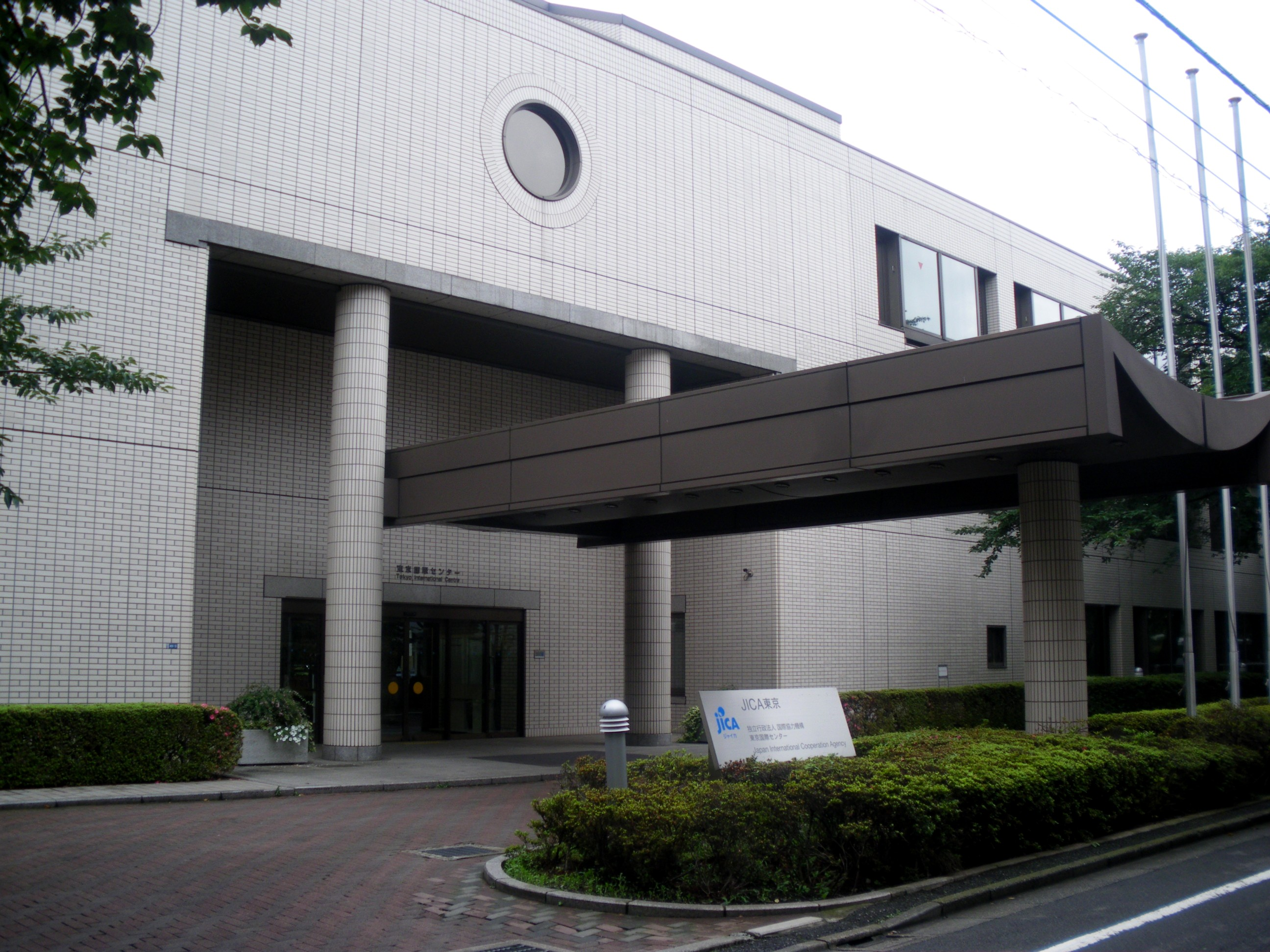
JICA Center Tokyo, Shibuya.

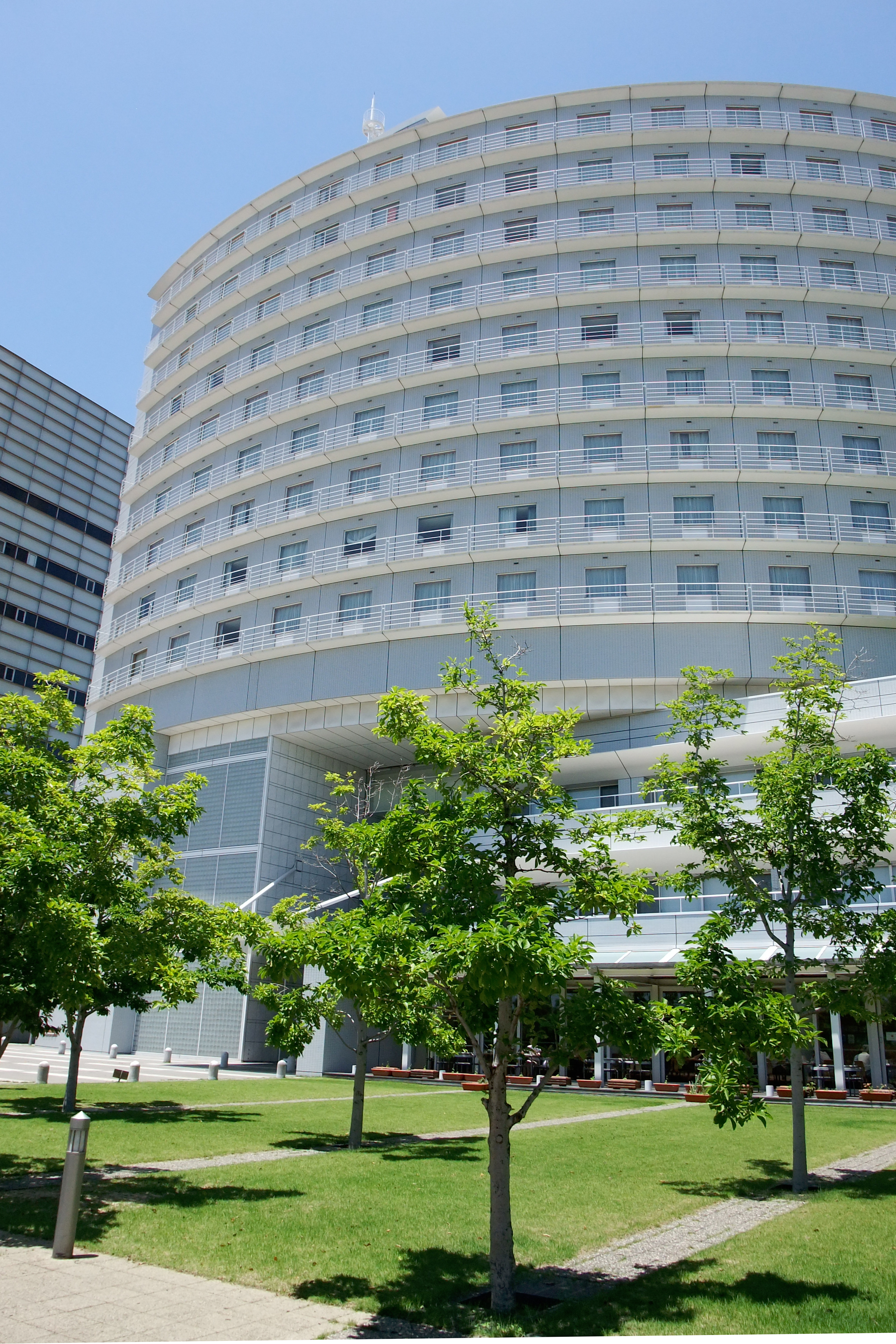
JICA Center Kansai, Chūō-ku, Kobe, Hyōgo.

The Japan International Cooperation Agency (Japanese: 独立行政法人国際協力機構, romanized: dokuritsu gyōseihōjin kokusai kyōryoku kikō), also known as JICA, is an incorporated administrative agency of the Government of Japan. It is the principal agency responsible for implementing Japan's bilateral Official Development Assistance (ODA), providing grants, Japanese ODA loans and technical cooperation to developing countries. Its objectives include supporting socioeconomic development, recovery and economic stability in developing regions, as well as promoting international cooperation.

According to the OECD, Japan's total ODA amounted to approximately US$17.5 billion in 2022, measured using the grant-equivalent methodology, representing 0.39% of its Gross National Income (GNI). This represented a 15.7% increase in real terms compared with 2021. Japan's bilateral ODA increased considerably during the year, partly reflecting increased lending. The OECD's Development Assistance Committee published its peer review of Japan's development cooperation on 12 October 2020.

JICA was led by Shinichi Kitaoka, former President of the International University of Japan, from October 2015 to March 2022. On 1 April 2022, Professor Akihiko Tanaka assumed the presidency of JICA.

== History ==
The Japan International Cooperation Agency (JICA) became an independent administrative institution on 1 October 2003, replacing its predecessor, which had been established in August 1974. A further major restructuring took place on 1 October 2008, when JICA integrated the overseas economic cooperation operations of the former Japan Bank for International Cooperation (JBIC) and certain grant-aid responsibilities previously handled by Japan's Ministry of Foreign Affairs (MOFA). This transformation established JICA as Japan's principal integrated development assistance implementing agency.

JICA is one of the world's major bilateral development agencies, with operations spanning more than 150 countries and regions. It implements Japan's development assistance through three principal schemes: technical cooperation, grant aid and concessional ODA loans. Its activities also include collaboration with international organisations, private-sector entities and other development partners to address global development challenges.

Following its conversion into an independent administrative institution in October 2003, JICA introduced a series of organisational and operational reforms under its field-oriented approach. These reforms aimed to strengthen overseas offices by transferring personnel, responsibilities and decision-making authority from Tokyo headquarters to the field. Greater emphasis was placed on locally driven project formulation, implementation and evaluation, while headquarters increasingly focused on supporting overseas offices. The reforms also sought to streamline organisational structures, reduce duplication, improve operational efficiency and accelerate project implementation.

JICA has increasingly incorporated the concept of "human security" into its development cooperation, placing individuals and local communities at the centre of its activities. This approach emphasises protecting people from threats such as poverty, conflicts, natural disasters and infectious diseases, while empowering communities to improve their own living conditions. Accordingly, JICA supports people-centred development initiatives in areas such as education, healthcare, food security, disaster management and community development, with particular attention to socially vulnerable groups.

In February 2026, Russia designated the Japan International Cooperation Agency (JICA) as an "undesirable organisation" within its territory. The organisation was added to the Russian Ministry of Justice's register on 17 February 2026, following a decision by the Prosecutor General's Office dated 9 February 2026.

=== Timeline ===
- 1954 Oct – Japan joined the Colombo Plan on 6 October and began providing technical cooperation to developing countries.
- 1962 Jun – Overseas Technical Cooperation Agency (OTCA) established.
- 1963 Jul – Japan Emigration Service (JEMIS) established.
- 1965 Apr – Japan Overseas Cooperation Volunteers (JOCV) programme launched.
- 1974 Aug – Japan International Cooperation Agency (JICA) established through the integration of OTCA and JEMIS.
- 1987 Sep – Japan Disaster Relief Team Law enacted, providing a statutory basis for Japan's international disaster relief operations.
- 1989 Dec – Japan became the world's largest ODA donor, surpassing the United States in net ODA disbursements.
- 1990 – Senior Cooperation Specialist and Senior Overseas Volunteer programmes introduced.
- 2003 Oct – JICA reorganised as an Independent Administrative Institution, effective 1 October 2003.

=== Presidents ===
JICA's current and former presidents:

- 1 April 2022 – Present: Akihiko Tanaka
- 1 October 2015 – 31 March 2022: Shinichi Kitaoka
- 1 April 2012 – 30 September 2015: Akihiko Tanaka
- 1 October 2003 – 30 March 2012: Sadako Ogata

== Activities ==
JICA plays a central role in implementing Japan's Official Development Assistance (ODA), particularly its bilateral assistance programmes. Its principal forms of assistance include technical cooperation, grant aid and concessional ODA loans (yen loans).

According to Japan's Ministry of Foreign Affairs, the country's total ODA amounted to approximately US$16.3 billion in 2020, representing a 4.3% increase over the previous year under the grant-equivalent methodology. JICA's technical cooperation activities include human resource development, institutional strengthening, feasibility studies, preparation of master plans and the dispatch of technical experts to developing countries.

Some of JICA's well-established volunteer and emergency assistance programmes include the Japan Overseas Cooperation Volunteers (JOCV), the Senior Overseas Volunteer programme and the Japan Disaster Relief (JDR) teams. The latter are deployed by the Japanese Government in response to major disasters overseas, with JICA responsible for their operational coordination. For example, following the devastating earthquake in Pakistan on 8 October 2005, Japan dispatched a 49-member rescue team and medical relief teams to assist affected communities.

=== Technical training program ===
JICA provides technical training to participants from developing countries through its Knowledge Co-Creation Programs (KCCP), covering a wide range of fields, including healthcare, agriculture, forestry, fisheries, industrial development, public administration, infrastructure and education. These programmes include group and region-focused courses, country-specific training, individual training and long-term programmes. Their duration varies according to the subject and objectives, ranging from short-term courses to postgraduate programmes lasting more than a year.

JICA operates domestic training centres across Japan, which provide accommodation, classrooms and other facilities for international participants. It also collaborates with Japanese universities, research institutions, hospitals, government agencies and other organisations to deliver specialised training.

=== Volunteer dispatch ===
- Japan Overseas Cooperation Volunteers (JOCV)
- Senior Volunteers
- Japan Overseas Cooperation Volunteers for Nikkei Communities
- Senior Volunteers for Nikkei Communities

== See also ==
- Development aid
- Japan Foundation
- Peace Corps
- JICA Research Institute
- SATREPS
