= Angle-resolved photoemission spectroscopy =

Experimental technique to determine the distribution of electrons in solids

ARPES spectrum of a two-dimensional electronic state localized at the (111) surface of copper. The energy has free-electron-like momentum dependence, p^{2}/2m, where m = 0.46m_{e}. Color scale represents electron counts per kinetic energy and emission angle channel. When 21.22 eV photons are used, the Fermi level is imaged at 16.64 eV.

Angle-resolved photoemission spectroscopy (ARPES) is an experimental technique used in condensed matter physics to probe the allowed energies and momenta of the electrons in a material, usually a crystalline solid. It is based on the photoelectric effect, in which an incoming photon of sufficient energy ejects an electron from the surface of a material. By directly measuring the kinetic energy and emission angle distributions of the emitted photoelectrons, the technique can map the electronic band structure and Fermi surfaces. ARPES is best suited for the study of one- or two-dimensional materials. It has been used by physicists to investigate high-temperature superconductors, graphene, topological materials, quantum well states, and materials exhibiting charge density waves.

ARPES systems consist of a monochromatic light source to deliver a narrow beam of photons, a sample holder connected to a manipulator used to position the sample of a material, and an electron spectrometer. The equipment is contained within an ultra-high vacuum (UHV) environment, which protects the sample and prevents scattering of the emitted electrons. After being dispersed along two perpendicular directions with respect to kinetic energy and emission angle, the electrons are directed to a detector and counted to provide ARPES spectra—slices of the band structure along one momentum direction. Some ARPES instruments can extract a portion of the electrons alongside the detector to measure the polarization of their spin.

== Principle ==
Electrons in crystalline solids can only populate states of certain energies and momenta, others being forbidden by quantum mechanics. They form a continuum of states known as the band structure of the solid. The band structure determines if a material is an insulator, a semiconductor, or a metal, how it conducts electricity and in which directions it conducts best, or how it behaves in a magnetic field.

Angle-resolved photoemission spectroscopy determines the band structure and helps understand the scattering processes and interactions of electrons with other constituents of a material. It does so by observing the electrons ejected by photons from their initial energy and momentum state into the state whose energy is by the energy of the photon higher than the initial energy, and higher than the binding energy of the electron in the solid. In the process, the electron's momentum remains virtually intact, except for its component perpendicular to the material's surface. The band structure is thus translated from energies at which the electrons are bound within the material, to energies that free them from the crystal binding and enable their detection outside of the material.

By measuring the freed electron's kinetic energy, its velocity and absolute momentum can be calculated. By measuring the emission angle with respect to the surface normal, ARPES can also determine the two in-plane components of momentum that are in the photoemission process preserved. In many cases, if needed, the third component can be reconstructed as well.

== Instrumentation ==
Typical laboratory setup of an ARPES experiment (not to scale): Helium discharge lamp as an ultraviolet light source, sample holder that attaches to a vacuum manipulator, and hemispherical electron energy analyzer.

A typical instrument for angle-resolved photoemission consists of a light source, a sample holder attached to a manipulator, and an electron spectrometer. These are all part of an ultra-high vacuum system that provides the necessary protection from adsorbates for the sample surface and eliminates scattering of the electrons on their way to the analyzer.

The light source delivers to the sample a monochromatic, usually polarized, focused, high-intensity beam of ~10^{12} photons/s with a few meV energy spread. Light sources range from compact noble-gas discharge UV lamps and radio-frequency plasma sources (10–40 eV), ultraviolet lasers (5–11 eV) to synchrotron insertion devices that are optimized for different parts of the electromagnetic spectrum (from 10 eV in the ultraviolet to 1000 eV X-rays).

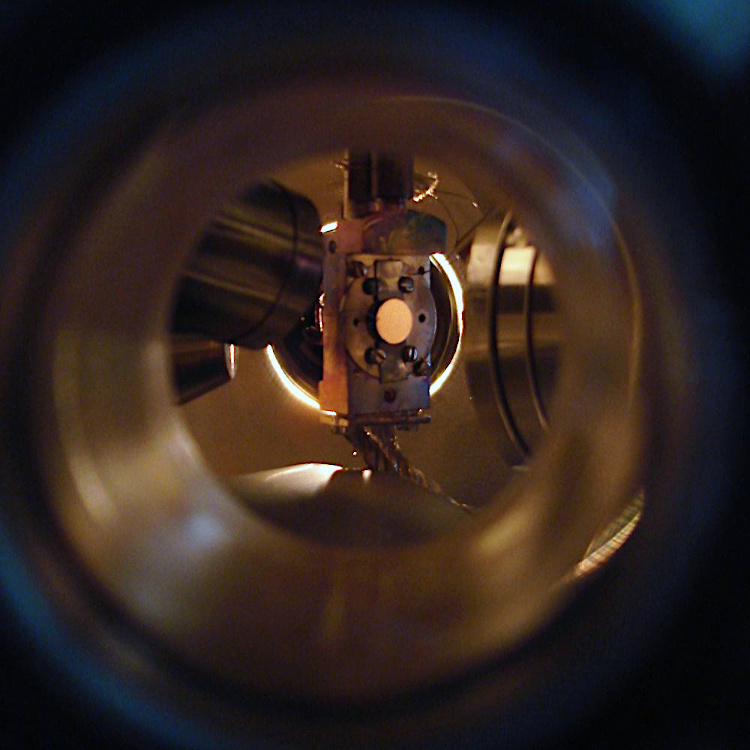
A view through the window of an ultrahigh vacuum chamber for angle-resolved photoemission spectroscopy. The crystal holder with integrated e-beam heating is attached to a xyz+theta manipulator on top, and by a silver braid to a cryocooler on the bottom. The lens of the electron analyzer and UV source capillary are visible on the right.

The sample holder accommodates samples of crystalline materials, the electronic properties of which are to be investigated. It facilitates their insertion into the vacuum, cleavage to expose clean surfaces, and precise positioning. The holder works as the extension of a manipulator that makes translations along three axes, and rotations to adjust the sample's polar, azimuth and tilt angles possible. The holder has sensors or thermocouples for precise temperature measurement and control. Cooling to temperatures as low as 1 kelvin is provided by cryogenic liquefied gases, cryocoolers, and dilution refrigerators. Resistive heaters attached to the holder provide heating up to a few hundred °C, whereas miniature backside electron-beam bombardment devices can yield sample temperatures as high as 2000 °C. Some holders can also have attachments for light beam focusing and calibration.

Electron trajectories in an ARPES spectrometer electrostatic lens shown in the plane of angular dispersion. The instrument shows a certain degree of focusing on the same detection channel of the electrons leaving the crystal at the same angle but originating from two separate spots on the sample. Here, the simulated separation is 0.5 mm.

The electron spectrometer disperses the electrons along two spatial directions in accordance with their kinetic energy and their emission angle when exiting the sample; in other words, it provides mapping of different energies and emission angles to different positions on the detector. In the type most commonly used, the hemispherical electron energy analyzer, the electrons first pass through an electrostatic lens. The lens has a narrow focal spot that is located some 40 mm from the entrance to the lens. It further enhances the angular spread of the electron plume, and serves it with adjusted energy to the narrow entrance slit of the energy dispersing part.

Angle- and energy-resolving electron spectrometer for ARPES (schematic)

The energy dispersion is carried out for a narrow range of energies around the so-called pass energy in the direction perpendicular to the direction of angular dispersion, that is perpendicular to the cut of a ~25 mm long and ⪆0.1 mm wide slit. The angular dispersion previously achieved around the axis of the cylindrical lens is only preserved along the slit, and depending on the lens mode and the desired angular resolution is usually set to amount to ±3°, ±7° or ±15°. The hemispheres of the energy analyzer are kept at constant voltages so that the central trajectory is followed by electrons that have the kinetic energy equal to the set pass energy; those with higher or lower energies end up closer to the outer or the inner hemisphere at the other end of the analyzer. This is where an electron detector is mounted, usually in the form of a 40 mm microchannel plate paired with a fluorescent screen. Electron detection events are recorded using an outside camera and are counted in hundreds of thousands of separate angle vs. kinetic energy channels. Some instruments are additionally equipped with an electron extraction tube at one side of the detector to enable the measurement of the electrons' spin polarization.

Modern analyzers are capable of resolving the electron emission angles as low as 0.1°. Energy resolution is pass-energy and slit-width dependent so the operator chooses between measurements with ultrahigh resolution and low intensity (< 1 meV at 1 eV pass energy) or poorer energy resolutions of 10 meV or more at higher pass energies and with wider slits resulting in higher signal intensity. The instrument's resolution shows up as artificial broadening of the spectral features: a Fermi energy cutoff wider than expected from the sample's temperature alone, and the theoretical electron's spectral function convolved with the instrument's resolution function in both energy and momentum/angle.

Sometimes, instead of hemispherical analyzers, time-of-flight analyzers are used. These, however, require pulsed photon sources and are most common in laser-based ARPES labs.

== Basic relations ==
Angle-resolved photoemission spectroscopy is an angle-selected refinement of ordinary photoemission spectroscopy. Light of frequency $\nu$ made up of photons of energy $h\nu$, where $h$ is the Planck constant, is used to stimulate the transitions of electrons from occupied to unoccupied electronic state of the solid. If a photon's energy is greater than the binding energy of an electron $E_\text{B}$, the electron will eventually leave the solid without being scattered, and be observed with kinetic energy

$$E_\text{k}=h\nu-E_\text{B}$$

at angle $\vartheta$ relative to the surface normal, both characteristic of the studied material. (Note: For simplicity reasons, the work function has been included in the expression for $E_\text{k}$ as part of $E_\text{B}$ (true meaning of the binding energy). In practice, however, the binding energy is expressed relative to a material's Fermi level, which can be read off of an ARPES spectrum. The work function is the difference between the Fermi level and the vacuum level where electrons are free.)

Left: Analyzer angle – energy map I_{0}(α,E_{k}) around vertical emission. Right: Analyzer angle – energy maps I_{θ}(α,E_{k}) at several polar angles away from vertical emission.

Electron emission intensity maps measured by ARPES as a function of $E_\text{k}$ and $\vartheta$ are representative of the intrinsic distribution of electrons in the solid expressed in terms of their binding energy $E_\text{B}$ and the Bloch wave vector $\mathbf{k}$, which is related to the electrons' crystal momentum and group velocity. In the photoemission process, the Bloch wave vector is linked to the measured electron's momentum $\mathbf{p}$, where the magnitude of the momentum $|\mathbf{p}|$ is given by the equation

$$|\mathbf{p}|=\sqrt{2 m_\text{e} E_\text{k}}$$.

As the electron crosses the surface barrier, losing part of its energy due to the surface work function, only the component of $\mathbf{p}$ that is parallel to the surface, $\mathbf{p}_{\Vert}$, is preserved. From ARPES, therefore, only $\mathbf{k}_{\Vert} = \tfrac{1}{\hbar}\mathbf{p}_{\Vert}$ is known for certain and its magnitude is given by

$|\mathbf{ k}_{\Vert}| = \tfrac{1}{\hbar}|\mathbf{p_{\Vert}}|=\tfrac{1}{\hbar}\sqrt{2 m_\text{e} E_\text{k}} \sin\vartheta$.

Here, $\hbar$ is the reduced Planck constant.

Because of incomplete determination of the three-dimensional wave vector, and the pronounced surface sensitivity of the elastic photoemission process, ARPES is best suited to the complete characterization of the band structure in ordered low-dimensional systems such as two-dimensional materials, ultrathin films, and nanowires. When it is used for three-dimensional materials, the perpendicular component of the wave vector $k_{\perp}$ is usually approximated, with the assumption of a parabolic, free-electron-like final state with the bottom at energy $-V_0$. This gives:

$k_{\perp}=\tfrac{1}{\hbar}\sqrt{2m_\text{e}(E_\text{k} \cos^2\!\vartheta+V_0)}$.

The inner potential $V_0$ is an unknown parameter a priori. For d-electron systems, experiment suggest that $V_0$ ≈ 15 eV. In general, the inner potential is estimated through a series of photon energy-dependent experiments, especially in photoemission band mapping experiments.

== Fermi surface mapping ==
Left: Constant energy map near E_{F} in analyzer angle – polar angle units (polar motion perpendicular to analyzer slit). Right: Constant energy map near E_{F} in crystal momentum units (transformed from the analyzer angle – polar angle map).

Electron analyzers that use a slit to prevent the mixing of momentum and energy channels are only capable of taking angular maps along one direction. To take maps over energy and two-dimensional momentum space, either the sample is rotated in the proper direction so that the slit receives electrons from adjacent emission angles, or the electron plume is steered inside the electrostatic lens with the sample fixed. The slit width will determine the step size of the angular scans. For example, when a ±15° plume dispersed around the axis of the lens is served to a 30 mm long and 1 mm wide slit, each millimeter of the slit receives a 1° portion—in both directions; but at the detector the other direction is interpreted as the electron's kinetic energy and the emission angle information is lost. This averaging determines the maximal angular resolution of the scan in the direction perpendicular to the slit: with a 1 mm slit, steps coarser than 1° lead to missing data, and finer steps to overlaps. Modern analyzers have slits as narrow as 0.05 mm. The energy–angle–angle maps are usually further processed to give energy–k_{x}–k_{y} maps, and sliced in such a way to display constant energy surfaces in the band structure and, most importantly, the Fermi surface map when they are cut near the Fermi level.

== Emission angle to momentum conversion ==
Geometry of an ARPES experiment (not to scale). In this position, θ = 0° and τ = 0°, the analyzer is accepting electrons emitted vertically from the surface and α ≤ 8° around.

ARPES spectrometer measures angular dispersion in a slice α along its slit. Modern analyzers record these angles simultaneously, in their reference frame, typically in the range of ±15°. To map the band structure over a two-dimensional momentum space, the sample is rotated while keeping the light spot on the surface fixed. The most common choice is to change the polar angle θ around the axis that is parallel to the slit and adjust the tilt τ or azimuth φ so emission from a particular region of the Brillouin zone can be reached.

The momentum components of the electrons can be expressed in terms of the quantities measured in the reference frame of the analyzer as

$\mathbf{P}=[0,P\sin\alpha,P\cos\alpha]$, where $P=\sqrt{2 m_\text{e} E_\text{k}}$.

θ

θ and τ

θ, τ, and φ

Rotations of the reference frame of the sample. the analyzer measures a range of angles α in its own reference frame.

These components can be transformed into the appropriate components of momentum in the reference frame of the sample, $\mathbf{p}$, by using rotation matrices $R_\textrm{axis}(\textrm{angle})$. When the sample is rotated around the y-axis by θ, $\mathbf{P}$ there has components $R_y(\vartheta)\,\mathbf{P}$. If the sample is also tilted around x by τ, this results in $\mathbf{p}=R_x(\tau)R_y(\vartheta)\,\mathbf{P}$, and the components of the electron's crystal momentum determined by ARPES in this mapping geometry are

$$k_x = \tfrac{1}{\hbar}p_x=\tfrac{1}{\hbar}\sqrt{2 m_\text{e} E_\text{k}}\,\cos\alpha\sin\vartheta$$
$k_y = \tfrac{1}{\hbar}p_y = \tfrac{1}{\hbar}\sqrt{2 m_\text{e} E_\text{k}}\, (\pm\sin\alpha\cos\tau+\cos\alpha\sin\tau\cos\vartheta)$

choose sign at $\vartheta=0$ depending on whether $k_y$ is proportional
to $\sin(\alpha+\tau)$ or $\sin(\alpha-\tau)$

If high symmetry axes of the sample are known and need to be aligned, a correction by azimuth φ can be applied by rotating around z, when $\mathbf{p}=R_z(\varphi)R_x(\tau)R_y(\vartheta)\,\mathbf{P}$ or by rotating the transformed map I(E, k_{x}, k_{y}) around origin in two-dimensional momentum planes.

== Theory of photoemission intensity relations ==
The theory of photoemission is that of direct optical transitions between the states $|i\rangle$ and $|f\rangle$ of an N-electron system. Light excitation is introduced as the magnetic vector potential $\mathbf{A}$ through the minimal substitution $\mathbf{p} \mapsto \mathbf{p}+e\mathbf{A}$ in the kinetic part of the quantum-mechanical Hamiltonian for the electrons in the crystal. The perturbation part of the Hamiltonian comes out to be:

$$H' = \frac{e}{2m} (\mathbf{A}\cdot\mathbf{p} + \mathbf{p}\cdot\mathbf{A}) + \frac{e^2}{2m} |\mathbf{A}|^2$$.

In this treatment, the electron's spin coupling to the electromagnetic field is neglected. The scalar potential $\phi$ set to zero either by imposing the Weyl gauge $\phi=0$ or by working in the Coulomb gauge $\nabla\cdot\mathbf{A}=0$ in which $\phi$ becomes negligibly small far from the sources. Either way, the commutator $\left[\mathbf{A},\mathbf{p}\right]=i\hbar\,\nabla\cdot\mathbf{A}$ is taken to be zero. Specifically, in Weyl gauge $\nabla\cdot\mathbf{A}\approx0$ because the period of $\mathbf{A}$ for ultraviolet light is about two orders of magnitude larger than the period of the electron's wave function. In both gauges it is assumed the electrons at the surface had little time to respond to the incoming perturbation and add nothing to either of the two potentials. It is for most practical uses safe to neglect the quadratic $|A|^2$ term. Hence,

$$H' = \frac{e}{m} \mathbf{A}\cdot\mathbf{p}$$.

The transition probability is calculated in time-dependent perturbation theory and is given by the Fermi's golden rule:

$$\Gamma_{i \to f} = \frac{2\pi}{\hbar} |\langle f|H'|i \rangle|^2 \delta(E_f-E_i-h\nu)\propto |\langle f|\mathbf{A} \cdot \mathbf{p}|i\rangle|^2 \, \delta(E_f-E_i-h\nu)$$,

The delta distribution above is a way of saying that energy is conserved when a photon of energy $h\nu$ is absorbed $E_f=E_i+h\nu$.

If the electric field of an electromagnetic wave is written as $\mathbf{E}(\mathbf{r},t)=\mathbf{E_0}\sin(\mathbf{k}\cdot\mathbf{r}-\omega t)$, where $\omega=2\pi\nu$, the vector potential inherits its polarization and equals to $\mathbf{A}(\mathbf{r},t)=\tfrac{1}{\omega}\mathbf{E_0}\cos(\mathbf{k}\cdot\mathbf{r}-\omega t)$. The transition probability is then given in terms of the electric field as

$$\Gamma_{i \to f} \propto |\langle f|\tfrac{1}{\nu}\mathbf{E_0} \cdot \mathbf{p}|i\rangle|^2 \, \delta(E_f-E_i-h\nu)$$.

In the sudden approximation, which assumes an electron is instantaneously removed from the system of N electrons, the final and initial states of the system are taken as properly antisymmetrized products of the single particle states of the photoelectron $|k_i\rangle$, $|k_f\rangle$ and the states representing the remaining (N − 1)-electron systems.

The photoemission current of electrons of energy $E_f=E_{k}$ and momentum $\mathbf{p}=\hbar \mathbf{k}$ is then expressed as the products of

- $|\langle k_f|\mathbf{E_0} \cdot \mathbf{p}|k_i\rangle|^2 = M_{fi}$, known as the dipole selection rules for optical transitions, and
- $A(\mathbf{k},E)$, the one-electron removal spectral function known from the many-body theory of condensed matter physics

summed over all allowed initial and final states leading to the energy and momentum being observed. Here, E is measured with respect to the Fermi level E_{F}, and E_{k} with respect to vacuum so $E_\text{k} = E+h\nu-W$ where $W$, the work function, is the energy difference between the two referent levels. The work function is material, surface orientation, and surface condition dependent. Because the allowed initial states are only those that are occupied, the photoemission signal will reflect the Fermi-Dirac distribution function $f(E)=\frac{1}{1+e^{(E-E_\text{F})/k_\text{B}T}}$ in the form of a temperature-dependent sigmoid-shaped drop of intensity in the vicinity of E_{F}. In the case of a two-dimensional, one-band electronic system the intensity relation further reduces to

$I(E_\text{k},\mathbf{k_{\Vert}})=I_M(\mathbf{k_{\Vert}},\mathbf{E_0},\nu)\, f(E)\, A(\mathbf{k_{\Vert}},E)$.

=== Selection rules ===
The electronic states in crystals are organized in energy bands, which have associated energy-band dispersions $E(k)$ that are energy eigenvalues for delocalized electrons according to Bloch's theorem. From the plane-wave factor $\exp(i\mathbf{k}\cdot\mathbf{r})$ in Bloch's decomposition of the wave functions, it follows the only allowed transitions when no other particles are involved are between the states whose crystal momenta differ by the reciprocal lattice vectors $\mathbf{G}$, i.e. those states that are in the reduced zone scheme one above another (thus the name direct optical transitions).

Another set of selection rules comes from $M_{fi}$ (or $I_M$) when the photon polarization contained in $\mathbf{A}$ (or $\mathbf{E_0}$) and symmetries of the initial and final one-electron Bloch states $|k_i\rangle$ and $|k_f\rangle$ are taken into account. Those can lead to the suppression of the photoemission signal in certain parts of the reciprocal space or can tell about the specific atomic-orbital origin of the initial and final states.

=== Many-body effects ===
ARPES spectrum of the renormalized π band of electron-doped graphene; p-polarized 40 eV light, T = 80 K. Dotted line is the bare band. The kink at −0.2 eV is due to graphene's phonons.

The one-electron spectral function that is directly measured in ARPES maps the probability that the state of the system of N electrons from which one electron has been instantly removed is any of the ground states of the (N − 1)-particle system:

$$A(\mathbf{k},E) = \sum_{m} \left |\,  \left \langle \begin{matrix} {\scriptstyle(N-1)\,\mathrm{eigenstate}} \\ {\scriptstyle m} \end{matrix} \,\,|\,\, \begin{matrix} {\scriptstyle(N)\,\mathrm{eigenstate}} \\ {\scriptstyle\mathrm{with\,} \mathbf{k} \mathrm{\,removed}} \end{matrix} \right\rangle \, \right |^2 \, \delta(E-E^{N-1}_m+E^{N})$$.

If the electrons were independent of one another, the N-electron state with the state $|k_i\rangle$ removed would be exactly an eigenstate of the N − 1 particle system and the spectral function would become an infinitely sharp delta function at the energy and momentum of the removed particle; it would trace the $E_o(\mathbf{k})$ dispersion of the independent particles in energy-momentum space. In the case of increased electron correlations, the spectral function broadens and starts developing richer features that reflect the interactions in the underlying many-body system. These are customarily described by the complex correction to the single particle energy dispersion that is called the quasiparticle self-energy,

$$\Sigma(\mathbf{k}, E) = \Sigma'(\mathbf{k}, E) + i \Sigma''(\mathbf{k}, E)$$.

This function contains the full information about the renormalization of the electronic dispersion due to interactions and the lifetime of the hole created by the excitation. Both can be determined experimentally from the analysis of high-resolution ARPES spectra under a few reasonable assumptions. Namely, one can assume that the $M_{fi}$ part of the spectrum is nearly constant along high-symmetry directions in momentum space and that the only variable part comes from the spectral function, which in terms of $\Sigma$, where the two components of $\Sigma$ are usually taken to be only dependent on $E$, reads

$$A(\mathbf{k}, E) = -\frac{1}{\pi} \frac{\Sigma''(E)}{\left[E-E_{o}(\mathbf{k})-\Sigma'(E)\right]^2+\left[\Sigma''(E)\right]^2}$$

Constant energy cuts of the spectral function are approximately Lorentzians whose width at half maximum is determined by the imaginary part of the self-energy, while their deviation from the bare band is given by its real part.

This function is known from ARPES as a scan along a chosen direction in momentum space and is a two-dimensional map of the form $A(k,E)$. When cut at a constant energy $E_m$, a Lorentzian-like curve in $k$ is obtained whose renormalized peak position $k_m$ is given by $\Sigma'(E_m)$ and whose width at half maximum $w$ is determined by $\Sigma''(E_m)$, as follows:

1. $\Sigma'(E_m) = E_m-E_{o}(k_m)$
2. $\Sigma''(E_m) = \frac{1}{2} \left[E_{o}(k_m+{\textstyle \frac{1}{2}}w) - E_{o}(k_m-{\textstyle \frac{1}{2}}w) \right]$

The only remaining unknown in the analysis is the bare band $E_{o}(k)$. The bare band can be found in a self-consistent way by enforcing the Kramers-Kronig relation between the two components of the complex function $\Sigma(E)$ that is obtained from the previous two equations. The algorithm is as follows: start with an ansatz bare band, calculate $\Sigma''(E)$ by eq. (2), transform it into $\Sigma'(E)$ using the Kramers-Kronig relation, then use this function to calculate the bare band dispersion on a discrete set of points $k_m$ by eq. (1), and feed to the algorithm its fit to a suitable curve as a new ansatz bare band; convergence is usually achieved in a few quick iterations.

From the self-energy obtained in this way one can judge on the strength and shape of electron-electron correlations, electron-phonon (more generally, electron-boson) interaction, active phonon energies, and quasiparticle lifetimes.

In simple cases of band flattening near the Fermi level because of the interaction with Debye phonons, the band mass is enhanced by (1 + λ) and the electron-phonon coupling factor λ can be determined from the linear dependence of the peak widths on temperature.

For strongly correlated systems like cuprate superconductors, self-energy knowledge is unfortunately insufficient for a comprehensive understanding of the physical processes that lead to certain features in the spectrum. In fact, in the case of cuprate superconductors different theoretical treatments often lead to very different explanations of the origin of specific features in the spectrum. A typical example is the pseudogap in the cuprates, i.e., the momentum-selective suppression of spectral weight at the Fermi level, which has been related to spin, charge or (d-wave) pairing fluctuations by different authors. This ambiguity about the underlying physical mechanism at work can be overcome by considering two-particle correlation functions (such as Auger electron spectroscopy and appearance-potential spectroscopy), as they are able to describe the collective mode of the system and can also be related to certain ground-state properties.

== Uses ==
ARPES has been used to map the occupied band structure of many metals and semiconductors, states appearing in the projected band gaps at their surfaces, quantum well states that arise in systems with reduced dimensionality, one-atom-thick materials like graphene, transition metal dichalcogenides, and many flavors of topological materials. It has also been used to map the underlying band structure, gaps, and quasiparticle dynamics in highly correlated materials like high-temperature superconductors and materials exhibiting charge density waves.

When the electron dynamics in the bound states just above the Fermi level need to be studied, two-photon excitation in pump-probe setups (2PPE or time-resolved ARPES) is used. There, the first photon of low-enough energy is used to excite electrons into unoccupied bands that are still below the energy necessary for photoemission (i.e. between the Fermi and vacuum levels). The second photon is used to kick these electrons out of the solid so they can be measured with ARPES. By precisely timing the second photon, usually by using frequency multiplication of the low-energy pulsed laser and delay between the pulses by changing their optical paths, the electron lifetime can be determined on the scale below picoseconds.

== See also ==
- Quasiparticle interference imaging
