= Two-photon photoelectron spectroscopy =

Study of electronic structures

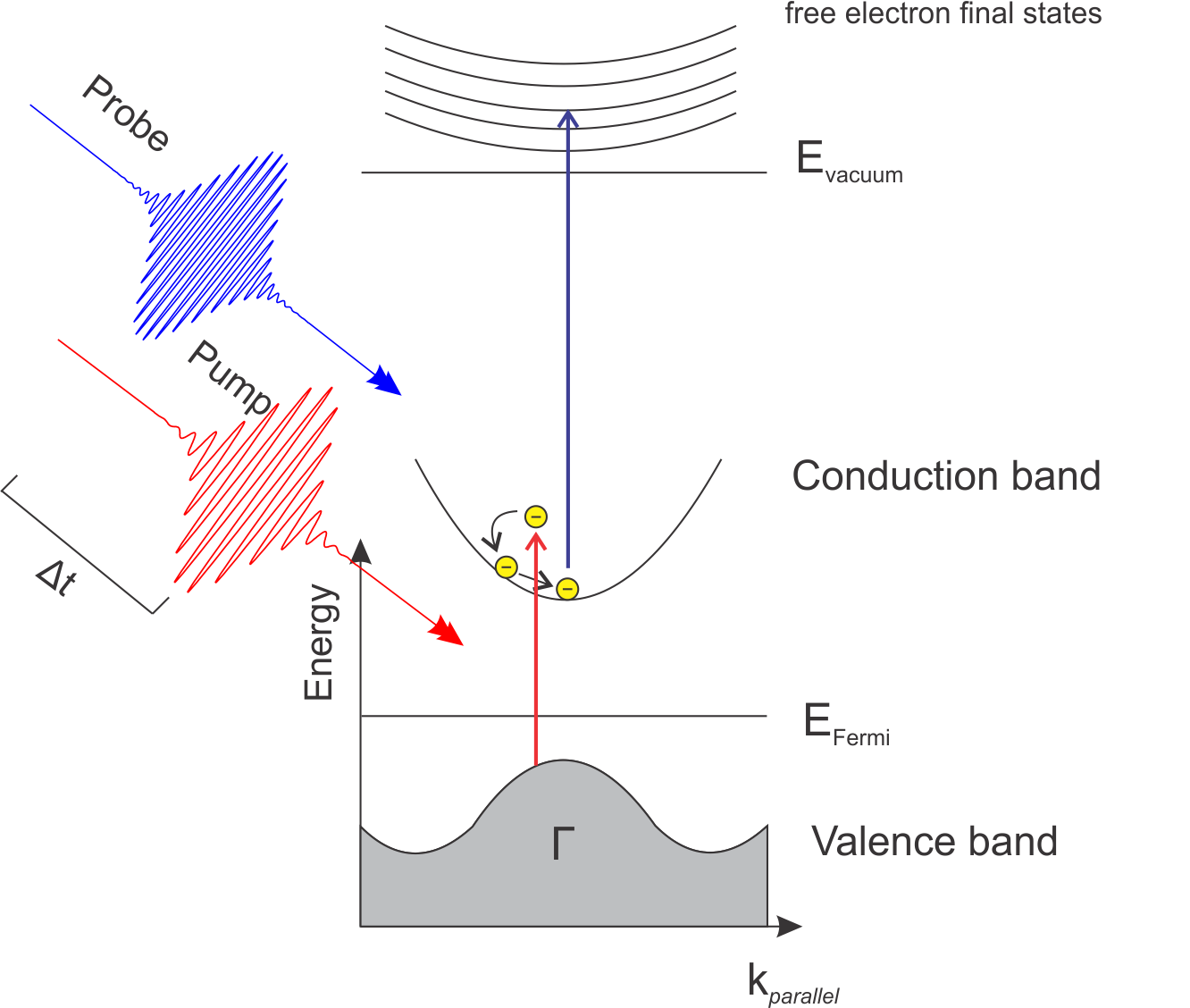
A lower energy pump pulse photoexcites an electron in a ground state or HOMO into a higher lying excited state. After a time delay, a second, higher energy pulse photoemits the excited electron into free electron states above the vacuum level.

Time-resolved two-photon photoelectron (2PPE) spectroscopy is a time-resolved spectroscopy technique which is used to study electronic structure and electronic excitations at surfaces. The technique utilizes femtosecond to picosecond laser pulses in order to first photoexcite an electron. After a time delay, the excited electron is photoemitted into a free electron state by a second pulse. The kinetic energy and the emission angle of the photoelectron are measured in an electron energy analyzer. To facilitate investigations on the population and relaxation pathways of the excitation, this measurement is performed at different time delays.

This technique has been used for many different types of materials to study a variety of exotic electron behaviors, including image potential states at metal surfaces, and electron dynamics at molecular interfaces.

== Basic physics ==
The final kinetic energy of the electron can be modeled by

$$E_\text{B}= E_\text{pump}+E_\text{probe}-E_\text{kin}-\Phi$$

where the E_{B} is the binding energy of the initial state, E_{kin} is the kinetic energy of the photoemitted electron, Φ is the work function of the material in question, and E_{pump}, E_{probe} are the photon energies of the laser pulses, respectively. Without a time delay, this equation is exact. However, as the delay between the pump and probe pulses increases, the excited electron may relax in an energy. Hence the energy of the photoemitted electron is lowered. With large enough time delay between the two pulses, the electron will relax all the way back to its original state. The timescales at which the electronic relaxation occurs, as well as the relaxation mechanism (either via vibronic coupling or electronic coupling) is of interest for applications of functional devices such as solar cells and light-emitting diodes.

== Experimental configuration ==
A laser pulse is first split using a beam splitter into two different laser lines. One laser line is used to create its second harmonic, giving it a higher photon energy which will serve as the probe pulse. The other laser line passes through a delay stage, which allows the experimenter to vary the delay between the laser pulses impinging on the sample.

Time-resolved two-photon photoelectron spectroscopy usually employs a combination of ultrafast optical technology as well as ultrahigh vacuum components. The main optical component is an ultrafast (femtosecond) laser system which generates pulses in the near infrared. Nonlinear optics are used to generate photon energies in the visible and ultraviolet spectral range. Typically, ultraviolet radiation is required to photoemit electrons. In order to allow for time-resolved experiments, a fine adjustment delay stage must be employed in order to manipulate the time delay between the pump and the probe pulse.

== See also ==
- Angle-resolved photoemission spectroscopy
- Laser-based angle-resolved photoemission spectroscopy
- Time-resolved spectroscopy
- Ultrafast laser spectroscopy
