= Electron optics =

Electron trajectories in electromagnetic fields

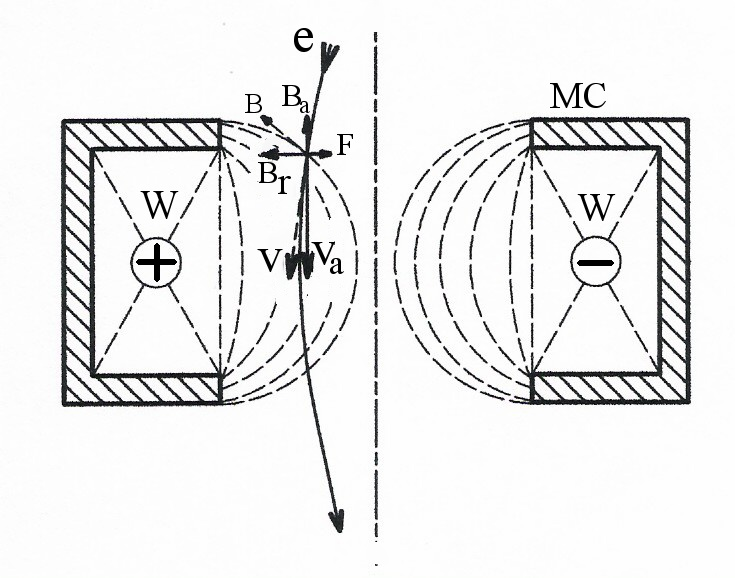
Magnetic lens

Electron optics is a mathematical framework for the calculation of electron trajectories in the presence of electromagnetic fields. The term optics is used because magnetic and electrostatic lenses act upon a charged particle beam similarly to optical lenses upon a light beam.

Electron optics calculations are crucial for the design of electron microscopes and particle accelerators. In the paraxial approximation, trajectory calculations can be carried out using ray transfer matrix analysis.

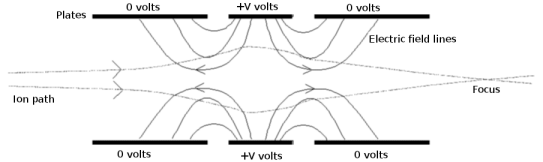
An einzel lens, a specific type of electrostatic lens. This figure shows the electron path. Six plates are parallel to the flight path with the middle plate at a particular potential. (This diagram was made for positive ions, and shows a positive voltage on the central plate. For electrons this voltage must be negative.)

== Electron properties ==
Electrons are charged particles (point charges with rest mass) with spin 1/2 (hence they are fermions). Electrons can be accelerated by suitable electric fields, thereby acquiring kinetic energy. Given sufficient voltage, the electron can be accelerated sufficiently fast to exhibit measurable relativistic effects. According to wave particle duality, electrons can also be considered as matter waves with properties such as wavelength, phase and amplitude.

== Geometric electron optics ==
The Hamilton's optico-mechanical analogy shows that electron beams can be modeled using concepts and mathematical formula of light beams. The electron particle trajectory formula matches the formula for geometrical optics with a suitable electron-optical index of refraction. This index of refraction functions like the material properties of glass in altering the direction ray propagation. In light optics, the refractive index changes abruptly at a surface between regions of constant index: the rays are controlled with the shape of the interface. In the electron-optics, the index varies throughout space and is controlled by electromagnetic fields created outside the electron trajectories.

=== Magnetic fields ===
Electrons interact with magnetic fields according to the second term of the Lorentz force: a cross product between the magnetic field and the electron velocity. In an infinite uniform field this results in a circular motion of the electron around the field direction with a radius given by:

$$r =  \frac{mv_\perp}{eB}$$

where r is the orbit radius, m is the mass of an electron, $v_\perp$ is the component of the electron velocity perpendicular to the field, e is the electron charge and B is the magnitude of the applied magnetic field. Electrons that have a velocity component parallel to the magnetic field will proceed along helical trajectories.

=== Electric fields ===
In the case of an applied electrostatic field, an electron will deflect towards the positive gradient of the field. Notably, this crossing of electrostatic field lines means that electrons, as they move through electrostatic fields change the magnitude of their velocity, whereas in magnetic fields, only the velocity direction is modified.

=== Relativistic theory ===
At relativistic electron velocity the geometrical electron optical equations rely on an index of refraction that includes both the ratio of electron velocity to light $v/c =\beta$ and $\mathbf{A}\cdot\mathbf{s}$, the component of the magnetic vector potential along the electron direction:
$$n(\mathbf{s}) = \frac{mv}{\sqrt{1-\beta^2}} + \frac{e}{c}\mathbf{A}\cdot\mathbf{s}$$
where $m$, $e$, and $c$ are the electron mass, electron charge, and the speed of light. The first term is controlled by electrostatic lens while the second one by magnetic lens.

Although not very common, it is also possible to derive effects of magnetic structures to charged particles starting from the Dirac equation.

== Diffractive electron optics ==
As electrons can exhibit non-particle (wave-like) effects such as interference and diffraction, a full analysis of electron paths must go beyond geometrical optics. Free electron propagation (in vacuum) can be accurately described as a de Broglie matter wave with a wavelength inversely proportional to its longitudinal (possibly relativistic) momentum. Fortunately as long as the electromagnetic field traversed by the electron changes only slowly compared with this wavelength (see typical values in matter wave#Applications of matter waves), Kirchhoff's diffraction formula applies. The essential character of this approach is to use geometrical ray tracing but to keep track of the wave phase along each path to compute the intensity in the diffraction pattern.

As a result of the charge carried by the electron, electric fields, magnetic fields, or the electrostatic mean inner potential of thin, weakly interacting materials can impart a phase shift to the wavefront of an electron. Thickness-modulated silicon nitride membranes and programmable phase shift devices have exploited these properties to apply spatially varying phase shifts to control the far-field spatial intensity and phase of the electron wave. Devices like these have been applied to arbitrarily shape the electron wavefront, correct the aberrations inherent to electron microscopes, resolve the orbital angular momentum of a free electron, and to measure dichroism in the interaction between free electrons and magnetic materials or plasmonic nanostructures.

== Limitations of applying light optics techniques ==
Electrons interact strongly with matter as they are sensitive to not only the nucleus, but also the matter's electron charge cloud. Therefore, electrons require vacuum to propagate any reasonable distance, such as would be desirable in electron optic system.

Penetration in vacuum is dictated by mean free path, a measure of the probability of collision between electrons and matter, approximate values for which can be derived from Poisson statistics.

== See also ==
- Charged particle beam
- Strong focusing
- Electron beam technology
- Electron microscope
- Beam emittance
- Ernst Ruska
- Hemispherical electron energy analyzer

== Electron Optics Simulation Software ==
Commercial programs

- SIMION (Ion and Electron Optics Simulator)
- EOD (Electron Optical Design)
- CPO (electronoptics.com)
- MEBS (Munro's Electron Beams Software)
- Field Precision LLC

Free Software

- IBSIMU (by Taneli Kalvas) (ibsimu.SourceForge.net)
