= Radar display =

Electronic device

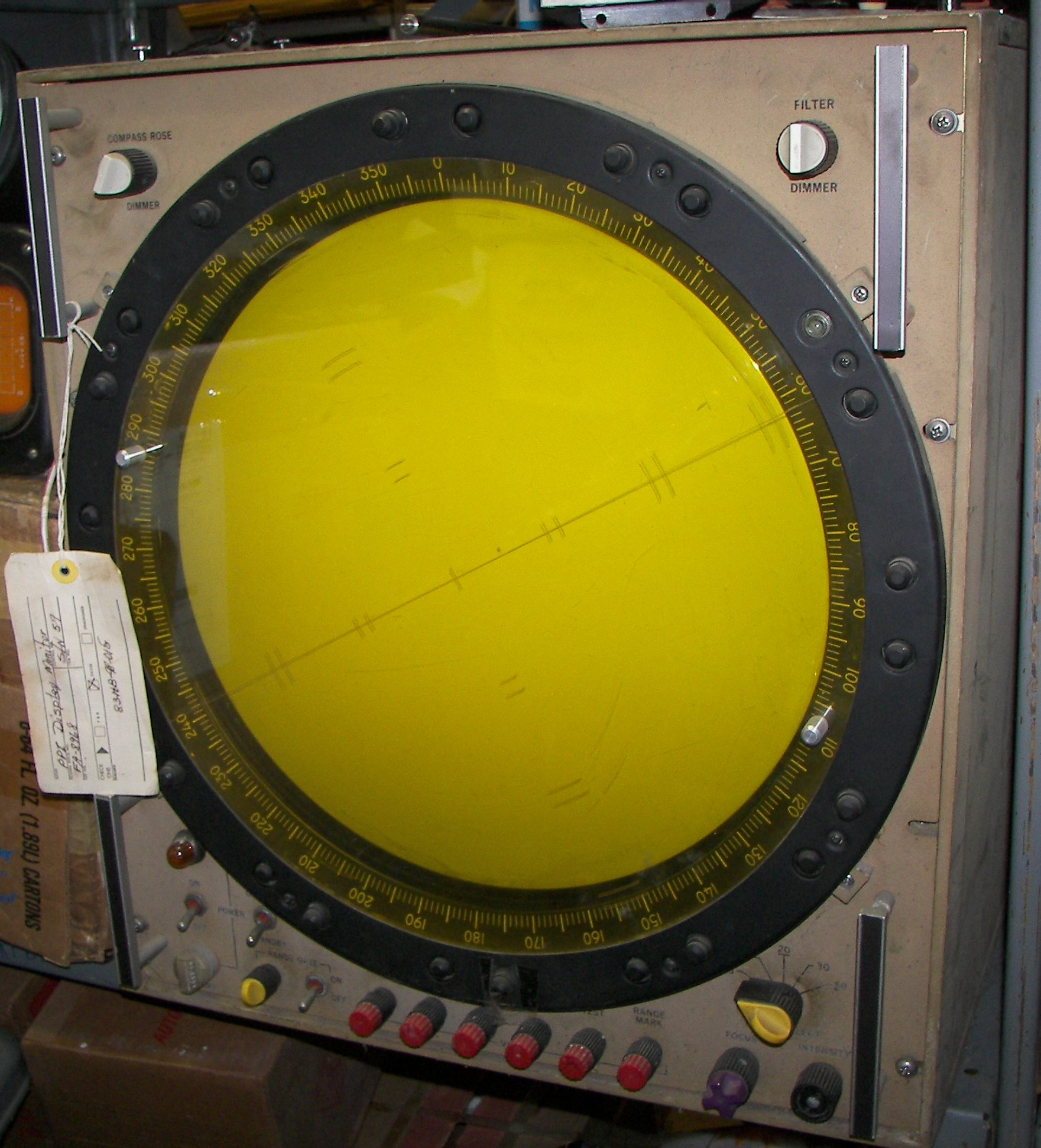
An airport surveillance radar display

A radar display is an electronic device that presents radar data to the operator. The radar system transmits pulses or continuous waves of electromagnetic radiation, a small portion of which backscatter off targets (intended or otherwise) and return to the radar system. The receiver converts all received electromagnetic radiation into a continuous electronic analog signal of varying (or oscillating) voltage that can be converted then to a screen display.

Modern systems typically use some sort of raster scan display to produce a map-like image. Early in radar development, however, numerous circumstances made such displays difficult to produce. People developed several different display types.

== Oscilloscopes ==
Oscilloscope attached to two sine-wave voltage sources, producing a circle pattern on the display.

Early radar displays used adapted oscilloscopes with various inputs. An oscilloscope generally receives three channels of varying (or oscillating) voltage as input and displays this information on a cathode ray tube. The oscilloscope amplifies the input voltages and sends them into two deflection magnets and to the electron gun producing a spot on the screen. One magnet displaces the spot horizontally, the other vertically, and the input to the gun increases or decreases the brightness of the spot. A bias voltage source for each of the three channels allows the operator to set a zero point.

In a radar display, the output signal from the radar receiver is fed into one of three input channels in the oscilloscope. Early displays generally sent this information to either X channel or Y channel to displace the spot on the screen to indicate a return. More modern radars typically used a rotating or otherwise moving antenna to cover a greater area of the sky, and in these cases, electronics, slaved to the mechanical motion of the antenna, typically moved the X and Y channels, with the radar signal being fed into the brightness channel.

== A-scope ==
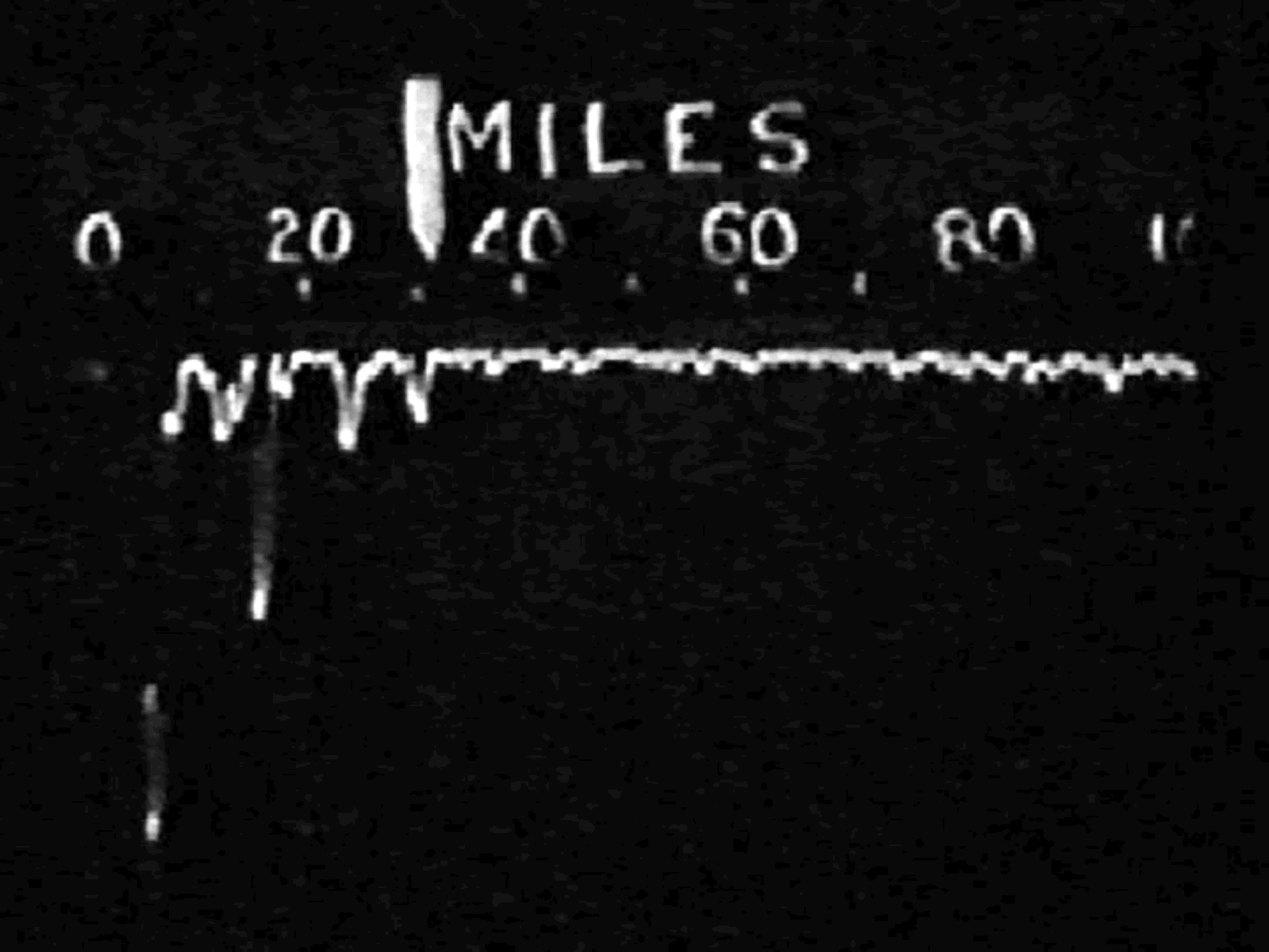
Chain Home is the canonical A-scope system. This image shows several target "blips" at ranges between 15 and 30 miles from the station. The large blip on the far left is the leftover signal from the radar's own transmitter; targets in this area could not be seen. The signal is inverted to make measurement simpler.

The original radar display, the A-scope or A-display, shows only the range, not the direction, to targets. These are sometimes referred to as R-scopes for range scope. A-scopes were used on the earliest radar systems during World War II, notably the seminal Chain Home (CH) system.

The primary input to the A-scope was the amplified return signal received from the radar, which was sent into the Y-axis of the display. Returns caused the spot to be deflected downward (or upward on some models), drawing vertical lines on the tube. These lines were known as a "blip" (or "pip"). The X-axis input was connected to a sawtooth voltage generator known as a time base generator that swept the spot across the display, timed to match the pulse repetition frequency of the radar. This spread out the blips across the display according to the time they were received. Since the return time of the signal corresponds to twice the distance to the target divided by the speed of light, the distance along the axis directly indicates the range to any target. This was usually measured against a scale above the display.

Chain Home signals were normally received on a pair of antennas arranged at right angles. Using a device known as a radiogoniometer, the operator could determine the bearing of the target, and by combining their range measurement with the bearing, they could determine a target's location in space. The system also had a second set of antennas, displaced vertically along the receiver towers. By selecting a pair of these antennas at different heights and connecting them to the radiogoniometer, they could determine the vertical angle of the target, and thus estimate its altitude. Since the system could measure both range and altitude, it was sometimes known as an HR-scope, from "height-range".

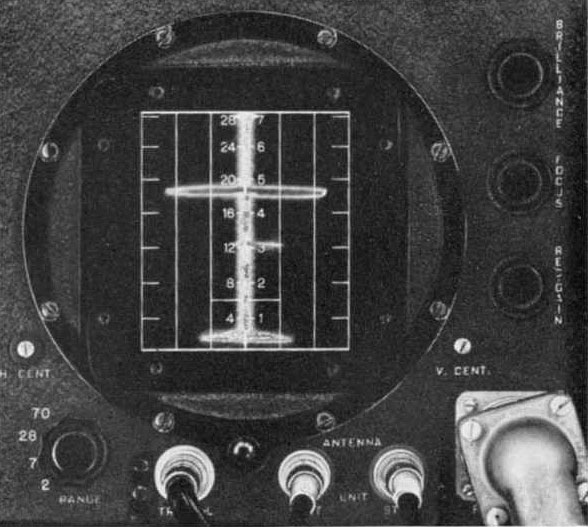
The L-scope was basically two A-scopes placed side by side and rotated vertically. By comparing the signal strength from two antennas, the rough direction of the blip could be determined. In this case there are two blips, a large one roughly centred and a smaller one far to the right.

Early American, Dutch and German radars used the J-scope, which resembled a circular version of the A-scope. These display range as an angle around the display face, as opposed to the linear distance along it. This arrangement allows greater accuracy in reading the range with the same sized display as an A-scope because the trace uses the full circumference rather than just the horizontal distance (so the time base is π times longer. For instance, on a typical . An electro-mechanical version of the J-scope display remained common on consumer boating depth meters until the 1990s.

W. A. S. Butement developed a further adaptation of the J-scope in the "spiral time base", which moved the blip both around the face and outward from the center. This produced a time base that was 7 feet (2.1 m) long, allowing very highly accurate measurements of range. This was used with coast artillery units, allowing them to lay their guns on even small boats entirely through the radar.

To improve the accuracy of angle measurements, the concept of lobe switching became common in early radars. In this system, two antennas are used, pointed slightly left and right, or above and below, the boresight of the system. The received signal would differ in strength depending on which of the two antennas was more closely pointed at the target, and be equal when the antenna was properly aligned. To display this, both antennas were connected to a mechanical switch that rapidly switched between the two, producing two blips in the display. In order to differentiate them, one of the two receivers had a delay so it would appear slightly to the right of the other. The operator would then swing the antenna back and forth until both blips were the same height. This was sometimes known as a K-scope.

A slightly modified version of the K-scope was commonly used for air-to-air (AI) and air-to-surface-vessel (ASV) radars. In these systems, the K-scope was turned 90 degrees so longer distances were further up the scope instead of further to the right. The output of one of the two antennas was sent through an inverter instead of a delay. The result was that the two blips were displaced on either side of the vertical baseline, both at the same indicated range. This allowed the operator to instantly see which direction to turn; if the blip on the right was shorter, they needed to turn to the right. These types of displays were sometimes referred to as ASV-scopes or L-scopes, although the naming was not universal.

Size of A-scope displays vary, but 5 to 7 inch diagonal was often used on a radar display. The 7JPx series of CRTs (7JP1, 7JP4 and 7JP7) was originally designed as an A-scope display CRT.

== B-Scope ==
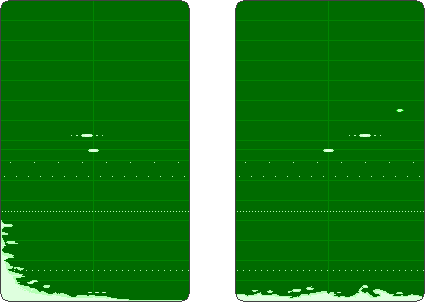
E-scope on the left and B-scope on the right. The E-scope shows two blips at slightly different altitudes, the top one being slightly closer as well. The B-scope shows three blips, the closest being head on, a second just to its right and slightly longer range, and a third near the right edge of the scanning pattern.

A B-scope or b-scan provides a 2-D "top down" representation of space, with the vertical axis typically representing range and the horizontal axis azimuth (angle). The B-scope's display represented a horizontal "slice" of the airspace on both sides of the aircraft out to the tracking angles of the radar. B-scope displays were common in airborne radars in the 1950s and 60s, which were mechanically scanned from side to side, and sometimes up and down as well.

The spot was swept up the Y-axis in a fashion similar to the A-scope's X-axis, with distances "up" the display indicating greater range. This signal was mixed with a varying voltage being generated by a mechanical device that depended on the current horizontal angle of the antenna. The result was essentially an A-scope whose range line axis rotated back and forth about a zero point at the bottom of the display. The radio signal was sent into the intensity channel, producing a bright spot on the display indicating returns.

An E-scope is essentially a B-scope displaying range vs. elevation, rather than range vs. azimuth. They are identical in operation to the B-scope, the name simply indicating "elevation". E-scopes are typically used with height finding radars, which are similar to airborne radars but turned to scan vertically instead of horizontally, they are also sometimes referred to as "nodding radars" due to their antenna's motion. The display tube was generally rotated 90 degrees to put the elevation axis vertical in order to provide a more obvious correlation between the display and the "real world". These displays are also referred to as a Range-Height Indicator, or RHI, but were also commonly referred to (confusingly) as a B-scope as well.

The H-scope is another modification of the B-scope concept, but displays elevation as well as azimuth and range. The elevation information is displayed by drawing a second "blip" offset from the target indicator by a short distance, the slope of the line between the two blips indicates the elevation relative to the radar. For instance, if the blip were displaced directly to the right this would indicate that the target is at the same elevation as the radar. The offset is created by dividing the radio signal into two, then slightly delaying one of the signals so it appears offset on the display. The angle was adjusted by delaying the time of the signal via a delay, the length of the delay being controlled by a voltage varying with the vertical position of the antenna. This sort of elevation display could be added to almost any of the other displays, and was often referred to as a "double dot" display.

== C-Scope ==
C-scope display. The target is above and to the right of the radar, but the range is not displayed.

A C-scope displays a "bullseye" view of azimuth vs. elevation. The "blip" was displayed indicating the direction of the target off the centreline axis of the radar, or more commonly, the aircraft or gun it was attached to. They were also known as "moving spot indicators" or "flying spot indicators" in the UK, the moving spot being the target blip. Range is typically displayed separately in these cases, often using a second display as an L-scope.

Almost identical to the C-scope is the G-scope, which overlays a graphical representation of the range to the target. This is typically represented by a horizontal line that "grows" out from the target indicator blip to form a wing-like shape. The wings grew in length at shorter distances to indicate the target was closer, as does the aircraft's wings when seen visually. A "shoot now" range indicator is often supplied as well, typically consisting of two short vertical lines centered on either side of the middle of the display. To make an interception, the pilot guides his aircraft until the blip is centered, then approaches until the "wings" fill the area between the range markers. This display recreated a system commonly used on gunsights, where the pilot would dial in a target's wingspan and then fire when the wings filled the area inside a circle in their sight. This system allowed the pilot to estimate the range to the target. In this case, however, the range is being measured directly by the radar, and the display was mimicking the optical system to retain commonality between the two systems.

== Plan position indicator ==
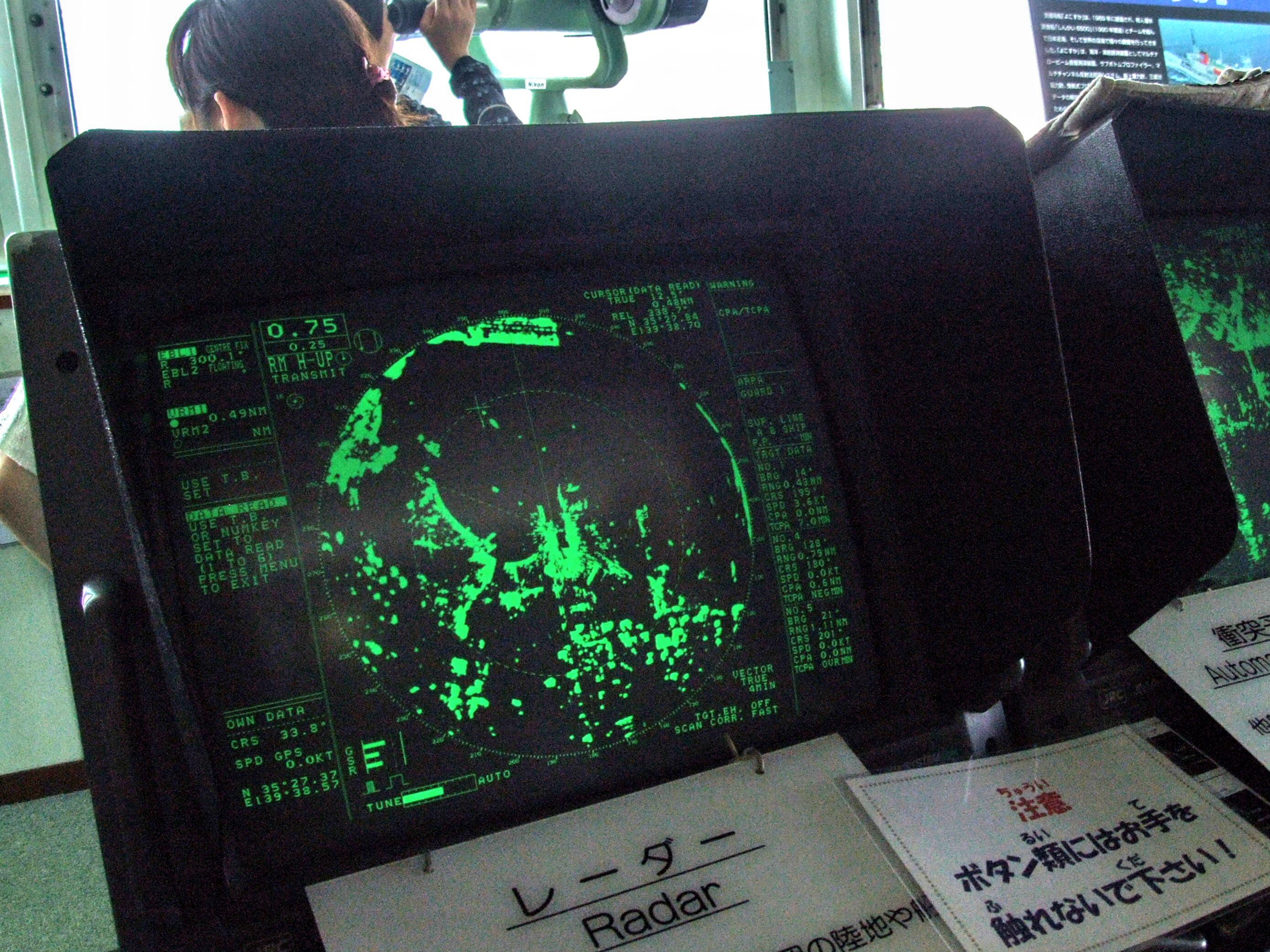
This image shows a modern PPI display in use, with the islands and ground surrounding the ship in green.

The PPI display provides a 2-D "all round" display of the airspace around a radar site. The distance out from the center of the display indicates range, and the angle around the display is the azimuth to the target. The current position of the radar antenna is typically indicated by a line extending from the center to the outside of the display, which rotates along with the antenna in realtime. It is essentially a B-scope extended to 360 degrees. The PPI display is typically what people think of as a radar display in general, and was widely used in air traffic control until the introduction of raster displays in the 1990s.

PPI displays are actually quite similar to A-scopes in operation, and appeared fairly quickly after the introduction of radar. As with most 2D radar displays, the output of the radio receiver was attached to the intensity channel to produce a bright dot indicating returns. In the A-scope a sawtooth voltage generator attached to the X-axis moves the spot across the screen, whereas in the PPI the output of two such generators is used to rotate the line around the screen. Some early systems were mechanical, using a rotating deflection coil around the neck of the display tube, but the electronics needed to do this using a pair of stationary deflection coils were not particularly complex, and were in use in the early 1940s.

Radar cathode ray tubes such as the 7JP4 used for PPI displays had a circular screen and scanned the beam from the center outwards. The deflection yoke rotated, causing the beam to rotate in a circular fashion. The screen often had two colors, often a bright short persistence color that only appeared as the beam scanned the display and a long persistence phosphor afterglow. When the beam strikes the phosphor, the phosphor brightly illuminates, and when the beam leaves, the dimmer long persistence afterglow would remain lit where the beam struck the phosphor, alongside the radar targets that were "written" by the beam, until the beam re-struck the phosphor.

== Beta Scan Scope ==
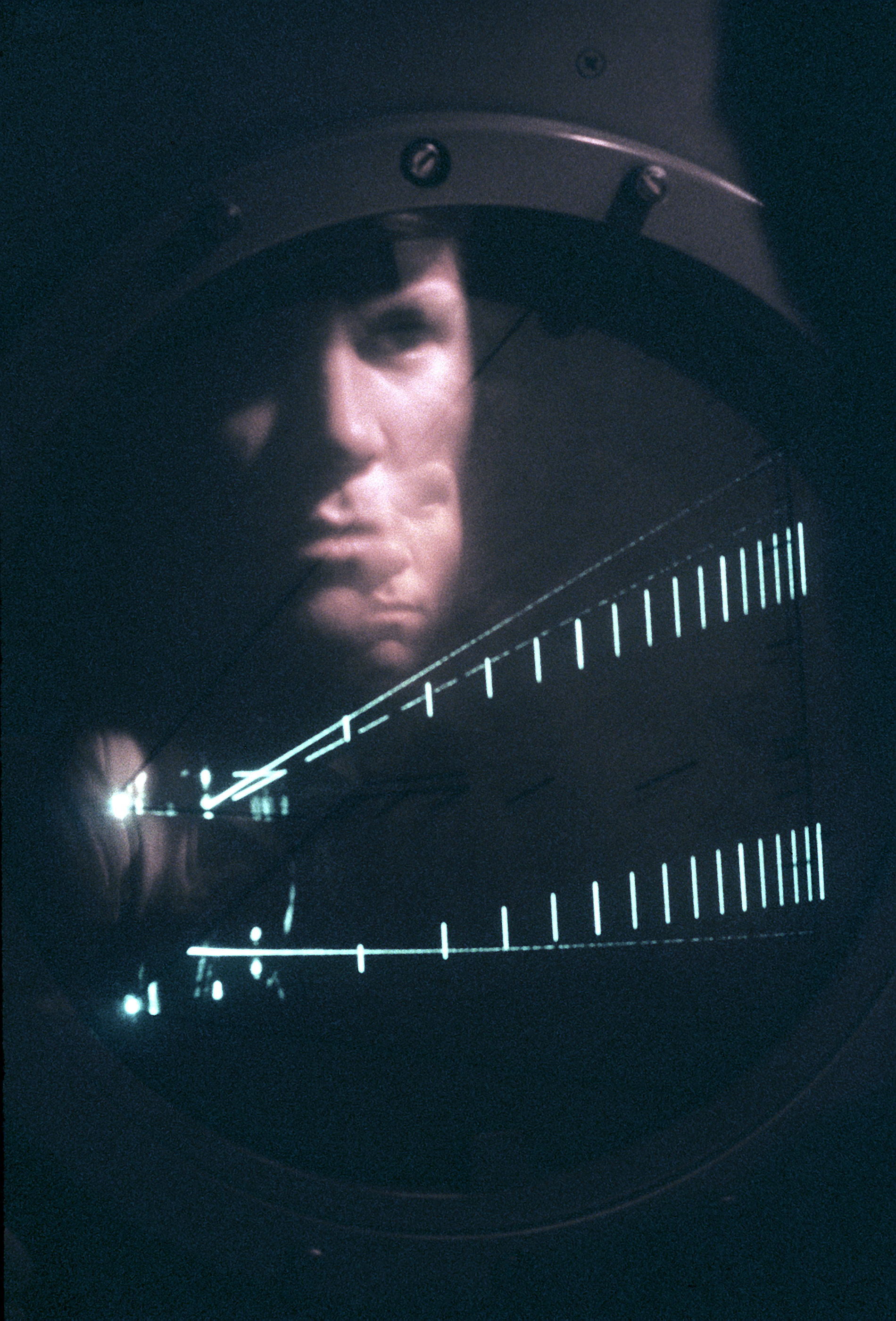
A Beta Scan display.

The specialist Beta Scan Scope was used for precision approach radar systems. It displays two lines on the same display, the upper one (typically) displaying the vertical approach (the glideslope), and the lower one the horizontal approach. A marker indicates the desired touchdown point on the runway, and often the lines are angled towards the middle of the screen to indicate this location. A single aircraft's "blip" is also displayed, superimposed over both lines, the signals being generated from separate antennas. Deviation from the centerline of the approach can be seen and easily relayed to the pilot.

In the image, the upper portion of the display shows the vertical situation, and the lower portion the horizontal. In the vertical, the two diagonal lines show the desired glideslope (upper) and minimum altitude approach (lower). The aircraft began its approach below the glideslope and captured it just before landing. The proper landing point is shown by the horizontal line at the left end. The lower display shows the aircraft starting to the left of the approach line and then being guided toward it.

== See also ==
- Index of aviation articles
- Blip-to-scan ratio
- Blip enhancement
- Radar jamming and deception
