= Electron spectrometer =

Device used to perform different forms of electron spectroscopy and electron microscopy

An electron spectrometer is a device used to perform different forms of electron spectroscopy and electron microscopy. This requires analyzing the energy of an incoming beam of electrons. Most electron spectrometers use a hemispherical electron energy analyzer in which the beam of electrons is bent with electric or magnetic fields. Higher energy electrons will be bent less by the beam, this produces a spatially distributed range of energies.

Electron spectrometers are used on a range of scientific equipment, including particle accelerators, transmission electron microscopes, and astronomical satellites.

== Types ==
Electron spectrometers may determine electron energy based on time of flight, retarding potential (effectively a high-pass filter), resonant collision or curvature in a deflecting field (magnetic or electric).

An electrostatic electron spectrometer uses the electric field, which cause electrons to move along field gradients, whereas magnetic devices cause electrons to move at right angles to the field. Magnetic fields will act in a direction perpendicular to the electron propagation, thereby conserving velocity, whereas electrostatic fields will cause electrons to move along the field gradient, which may change electron energies if the component of the direction of propagation and field gradients are not perpendicular. Owing to these effects, sector based designs are commonly used in electron spectrometers.

== Construction ==
The effective potential in the solution of motion in a magnetic or electric system with rotational symmetry leads to radial focusing onto a mean radius. By superposition of a quadrupole field axial focusing is possible while weakening the radial focusing, until the astigmatism vanishes. By breaking the rotational symmetry a bit and varying the electrostatic potential along the mean path of the spherical aberration is minimized.

All the electrons from an isotopic source may be sucked off and focused into a directed beam (much like in an electron gun), which can then be analyzed. The spectrometer can use entrance and exit slits or use a small source, which only emits into specific angle and a small detector. Photoelectron spectra from single crystals exhibit a dependency on the emission angle, and the entrance slit is needed at the entrance of the hemispherical electron analyzer in angle-resolved photoemission spectroscopy and related techniques. There, a position sensitive detector detects the energy along one direction and depending on the additional optics lateral resolution or one angle along the other direction.

Electrostatic spectrometers preserve the spin, which can be resolved afterwards.

== See also ==
- Angle-resolved photoemission spectroscopy, for electronic band structure determination
- Auger electron spectroscopy, field of analyzing material surfaces
- Electron energy loss spectroscopy
- PEEM
- Energy filtered transmission electron microscopy
- Mass spectrometry
- Time-of-flight mass spectrometry
