= Magnetic lens =

Lens for charged particles

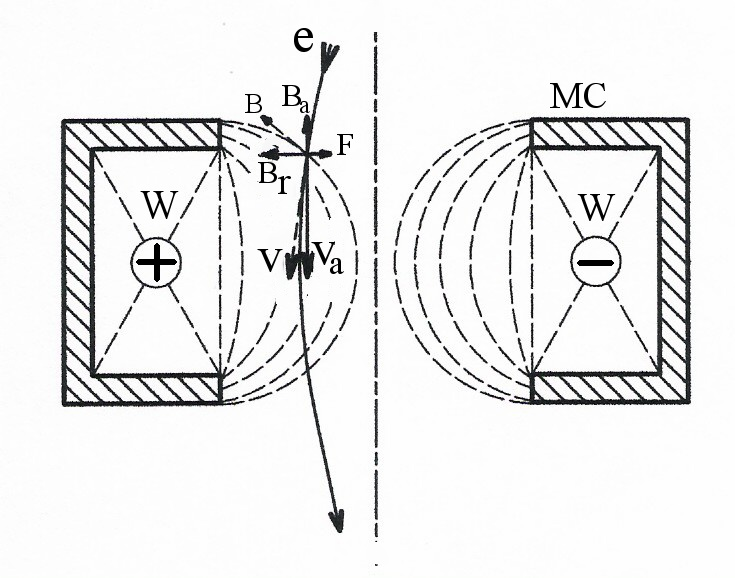

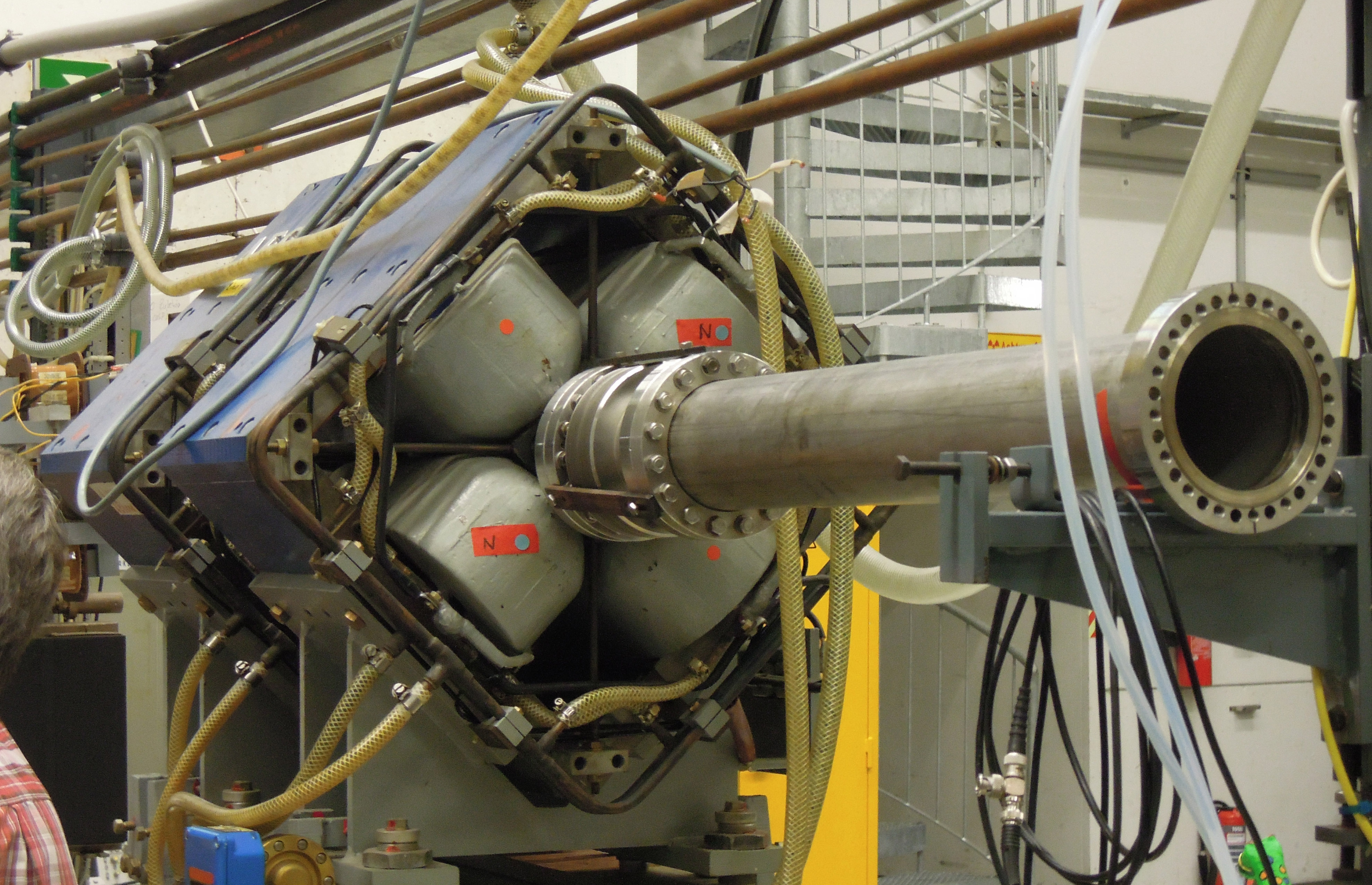
A subtype of a magnetic lens (quadrupole magnet) in the Maier-Leibnitz laboratory, Munich

A magnetic lens is a device for the focusing or deflection of moving charged particles, such as electrons or ions, by use of the magnetic Lorentz force. Its strength can often be varied by usage of electromagnets.

Magnetic lenses are used in diverse applications, from cathode ray tubes over electron microscopy to particle accelerators.

== Design ==
A magnetic lens typically consists of several electromagnets arranged in a quadrupole (see quadrupole magnet), sextupole, or higher format; the electromagnetic coils are placed at the vertices of a square or another regular polygon. From this configuration a customized magnetic field can be formed to manipulate the particle beam.

The passing particle is subjected to two vector forces $H_Z$ (parallel to the core), and $H_R$ (parallel to the radius of the lens). $H_R$ causes the particle to spiral through the lens, and this spiraling expose the electron to $H_Z$ which in turn focus the electron. Note that the magnetic field is inhomogeneous, particles close to the center are less strongly deflected than those passing the lens far from the axis.

== Uses ==
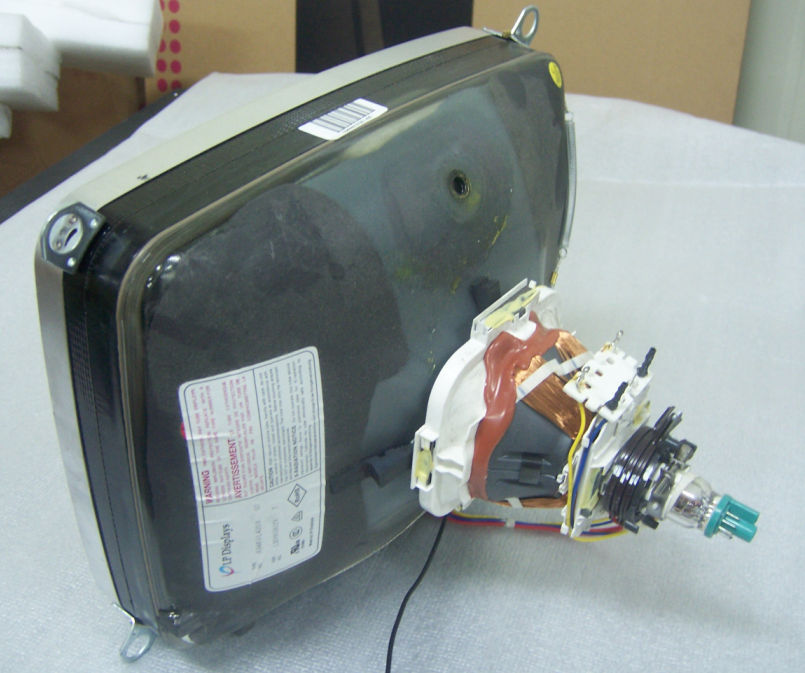
A deflection yoke (copper coils and white plastic former) around the rear neck of a cathode ray tube television

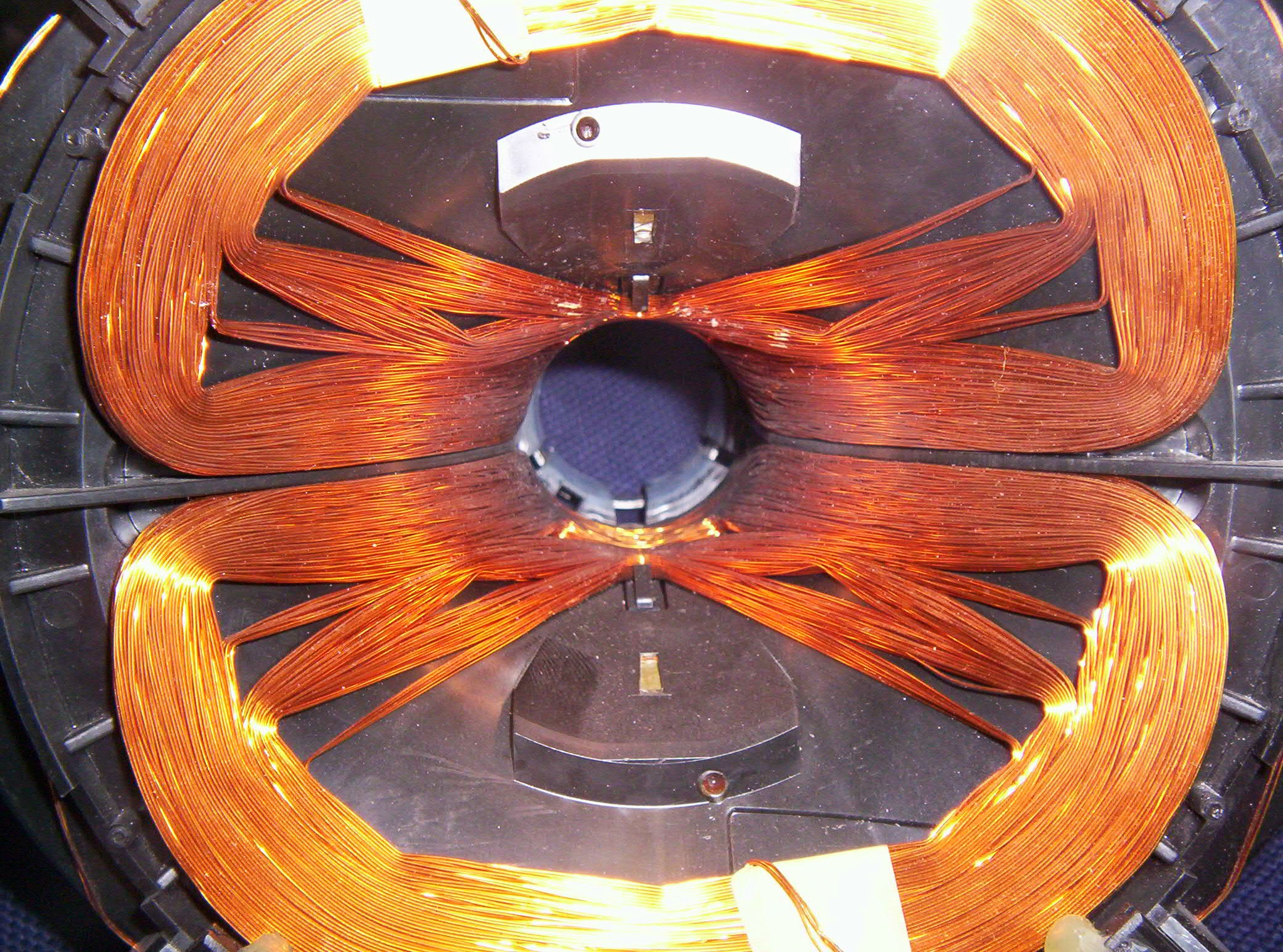
View inside the yoke, with the tube removed

Television sets employing cathode ray tubes use a magnetic lens in the form of a deflection yoke to enable an electron beam to scan the image by deflecting it vertically and horizontally.

== See also ==
- Charged particle beam
- Electron optics
- Electron beam technology
- Ion beam
- Mass spectrometry
- Quadrupole ion trap
- Quadrupole mass analyzer
