= Laser-based angle-resolved photoemission spectroscopy =

Laser-based angle-resolved photoemission spectroscopy is a form of angle-resolved photoemission spectroscopy that uses a laser as the light source. Photoemission spectroscopy is a powerful and sensitive experimental technique to study surface physics. It is based on the photoelectric effect originally observed by Heinrich Hertz in 1887 and later explained by Albert Einstein in 1905 that when a material is shone by light, the electrons can absorb photons and escape from the material with the kinetic energy: $E = hf-\phi$, where $hf$ is the incident photon energy, $\phi$ the work function of the material. Since the kinetic energy of ejected electrons are highly associated with the internal electronic structure, by analyzing the photoelectron spectroscopy one can realize the fundamental physical and chemical properties of the material, such as the type and arrangement of local bonding, electronic structure and chemical composition.

In addition, because electrons with different momentum will escape from the sample in different directions, angle-resolved photoemission spectroscopy is widely used to provide the dispersive energy-momentum spectrum. The photoemission experiment is conducted using synchrotron radiation light source with typical photon energy of 20 – 100 eV. Synchrotron light is ideal for investigating two-dimensional surface systems and offers unparalleled flexibility to continuously vary the incident photon energy. However, due to the high costs to construct and maintain this accelerator, high competition for beam time, as well as the universal minimum electron mean free path in the material around the operating photon energy (20–100 eV) which leads to the fundamental hindrance to the three-dimensional bulk materials sensitivity, an alternative photon source for angle-resolved photoemission spectroscopy is desirable.

If femtosecond lasers are used, the method can easily be extended to access excited electronic states and electron dynamics by introducing a pump-probe scheme, see also two-photon photoelectron spectroscopy.

== Laser-based ARPES ==
=== Background ===
Table-top laser-based angle-resolved photoemission spectroscopy had been developed by some research groups. Daniel Dessau of University of Colorado, Boulder, made the first demonstration and applied this technique to explore superconducting system. The achievement not only greatly reduces the costs and size of facility, but also, most importantly, provides the unprecedented higher bulk sensitivity due to the low photon energy, typically 6 eV, and consequently the longer photoelectron mean free path (2–7 nm) in the sample. This advantage is extremely beneficial and powerful for the study of strongly correlated materials and high-Tc superconductors in which the physics of photoelectrons from the topmost layers might be different from the bulk. In addition to about one-order-of-magnitude improvement in the bulk sensitivity, the advance in the momentum resolution is also very significant: the photoelectrons will be more broadly dispersed in emission angle when the energy of incident photon decreases. In other words, for a given angular resolution of the electron spectrometer, the lower photon energy leads to higher momentum resolution. The typical momentum resolution of a 6 eV laser-based ARPES is approximately 8 times better than that of a 50 eV synchrotron radiation ARPES. Besides, the better momentum resolution due to low photon energy also results in less k-space accessible to ARPES which is helpful to the more precise spectrum analysis. For instance, in the 50 eV synchrotron ARPES, electrons from the first 4 Brillouin zones will be excited and scattered to contribute to the background of photoelectron analysis. However, the small momentum of 6 eV ARPES will only access some part of the first Brillouin zone and therefore only those electrons from small region of k-space can be ejected and detected as the background. The reduced inelastic scattering background is desirable while doing the measurement of weak physical quantities, in particular the high-Tc superconductors.

=== Experimental realization ===
The first 6 eV laser-based ARPES system used a Kerr mode-locked Ti: sapphire oscillator is used and pumped with another frequency doubled Nd:Vanadate laser of 5 W and then generates 70 fs and 6 nJ pulses which are tunable around 840 nm (1.5 eV) with the 1 MHz repetition rate. Two stages of non-linear second harmonic generation of light are carried out through type Ι phase matching in β-barium borate and then the quadruple light with 210 nm (~ 6 eV) is generated and finally focused and directed into the ultra-high vacuum chamber as the low-energy photon source to investigate the electronic structure of the sample.

In the first demonstration, Dessau's group showed that the typical forth harmonic spectrum fits very well with the Gaussian profile with a full width at half maximum of 4.7 meV as well as presents a 200 μW power. The performance of high flux (~ 10^{14}- 10^{15} photons/s) and narrow bandwidth makes the laser-based ARPES overwhelm the synchrotron radiation ARPES even though the best undulator beamlines are used. Another noticeable point is that one can make the quadruple light pass through either 1/4 wave plate or 1/2 wave plate which produces the circular polarization or any linear polarization light in the ARPES. Because the polarization of light can influence the signal to background ratio, the ability to control the polarization of light is a very significant improvement and advantage over the synchrotron ARPES. With the aforementioned favorable features, including lower costs for operating and maintenance, better energy and momentum resolution, and higher flux and ease of polarization control of photon source, the laser-based ARPES undoubtedly is an ideal candidate to be employed to conduct more sophisticated experiments in condensed matter physics.

== Applications ==
=== High-T_{c} superconductor ===
One way to show the powerful ability of laser-based ARPES is to study high Tc superconductors. The following figure references refer to this publication. Fig. 1 shows the experimental dispersion relation, binding energy vs. momentum, of the superconducting Bi_{2}Sr_{2}CaCu_{2}O_{8+d} along the nodal direction of the Brillouin zone. Fig. 1 (b) and Fig. 1 (c) are taken by the synchrotron light source of 28 eV and 52 eV, respectively, with the best undulator beamlines. The significantly sharper spectral peaks, the evidence of quasiparticles in the cuprate superconductor, by the powerful laser-based ARPES are shown in Fig. 1 (a). This is the first comparison of dispersive energy-momentum relation at low photon energy from table-top laser with higher energy from synchrotron ARPES. The much clearer dispersion in (a) indicates the improved energy-momentum resolution as well as many important physical features, such as overall band dispersion, Fermi surface, superconducting gaps, and a kink by electron-boson coupling, are successfully reproduced. It is foreseeable that in the near future the laser-based ARPES will be widely used to help condensed matter physicists get more detailed information about the nature of superconductivity in the exotic materials as well as other novel properties that cannot be observed by the state-of-the-art conventional experimental techniques.

=== Time-resolved electron dynamics ===
Femtosecond laser-based ARPES can be extended to give spectroscopic access to excited states in time-resolved photoemission and two-photon photoelectron spectroscopy. By pumping an electron to a higher level excited state with the first photon, the subsequent evolution and interactions of electronic states as a function of time can be studied by the second probing photon. The traditional pump-probe experiments usually measure the changes of some optical constants, which might be too complex to obtain the relevant physics. Since the ARPES can provide a lot of detailed information about the electronic structures and interactions, the pump-probe laser-based ARPES may study more complicated electronic systems with sub-picosecond resolution.

== Summary and perspective ==
Even though the angle-resolved synchrotron radiation source is widely used to investigate the surface dispersive energy-momentum spectrum, the laser-based ARPES can even provide more detailed and bulk-sensitive electronic structures with much better energy and momentum resolution, which are critically necessary for studying the strongly correlated electronic system, high-T_{c} superconductor, and phase transition in exotic quantum system. In addition, the lower costs for operating and higher photon flux make laser-based ARPES easier to be handled and more versatile and powerful among other modern experimental techniques for surface science.

== See also ==
- Photoemission
- ARPES
- Two-photon photoelectron spectroscopy
- Synchrotron radiation
- XPS
- Fermi surface
- List of laser articles
