= Time-resolved spectroscopy =

Spectroscopic technique

In physics and physical chemistry, time-resolved spectroscopy is the study of dynamic processes in materials or chemical compounds by means of spectroscopic techniques. Most often, processes are studied after the illumination of a material occurs, but in principle, the technique can be applied to any process that leads to a change in properties of a material. With the help of pulsed lasers, it is possible to study processes that occur on time scales as short as 10^{−16} seconds. This is done to overcome the hampering background interference that often disrupts and challenges Raman measurements to improve spectra quality. All time-resolved spectra are suitable to be analyzed using the two-dimensional correlation method for a correlation map between the peaks.

== Time-gated Raman spectroscopy ==
The most common issue in conventional (CW) Raman spectroscopy (RS) is sample-induced fluorescence emission making the identification or quantification of materials challenging or impossible. An effective solution to this problem is time-gating (TG), which is a general technique used in signal processing. An integral part of Time-gated (TG) Raman spectroscopy (RS) is the temporally precise synchronization (picosecond range) between the pulsed laser excitation source and the sensitive and fast detector. The detector is able to collect the Raman signal during the short laser pulses, while fluorescence emission, which has a longer delay, is rejected during the detector dead-time. TG-Raman is also resistant against ambient light as well as thermal emissions, due to its short measurement duty cycle. Time-gating is based on Timegated® Raman Technology.

== Transient-absorption spectroscopy ==
Transient-absorption spectroscopy (TAS), also known as flash photolysis, is an extension of absorption spectroscopy. Ultrafast transient absorption spectroscopy, an example of non-linear spectroscopy, measures changes in the absorbance/transmittance in the sample. Here, the absorbance at a particular wavelength or range of wavelengths of a sample is measured as a function of time after excitation by a flash of light. In a typical experiment, both the light for excitation ('pump') and the light for measuring the absorbance ('probe') are generated by a pulsed laser. If the process under study is slow, then the time resolution can be obtained with a continuous (i.e., not pulsed) probe beam and repeated conventional spectrophotometric techniques.

Time-resolved absorption spectroscopy relies on the ability to resolve two physical actions in real time. The shorter the detection time, the better the resolution. As a result, femtosecond laser spectroscopy offers better resolution than nanosecond laser spectroscopy. In a typical experimental set up, a pump pulse excites the sample and later, a delayed probe pulse strikes the sample. In order to maintain the maximum spectral distribution, two pulses are derived from the same source. The impact of the probe pulse on the sample is recorded and analyzed with wavelength/ time to study the dynamics of the excited state.

Absorbance (after pump) – Absorbance (before pump) = ΔAbsorbance

ΔAbsorbance records any change in the absorption spectrum as a function of time and wavelength. As a matter of fact, it reflects ground state bleaching (-ΔA), further excitation of the excited electrons to higher excited states (+ΔA), stimulated emission (-ΔA) or product absorption (+ΔA). Bleaching of ground state refers to depletion of the ground state carriers to excited states. Stimulated emission follows the fluorescence spectrum of the molecule and is Stokes shifted relative to and often still overlaps with the bleach signal. This is a lasing effect (coherent emission) of the excited dye molecules under the strong probe light. This emission signal cannot be distinguished from the absorption signal and often gives false negative Δ absorbance peaks in the final spectra that can be decoupled via approximations. Product absorption refers to any absorption changes caused due to formation of intermediate reaction products. TA measurements can also be used to predict non emissive states and dark states unlike time resolved photoluminescence.

Transient absorption can be measured as a function of wavelength or time. The TA curve along wavelength provides information regarding evolution/decay of various intermediate species involved in chemical reaction at different wavelengths. The transient absorption decay curve against time contains information regarding the number of decay processes involved at a given wavelength, how fast or slow the decay processes are. It can provide evidences with respect to inter-system crossing, intermediate unstable electronic states, trap states, surface states etc.

=== Spectral Resolution of Transient Absorption ===
Transient absorption is a highly sensitive technique that can provide insightful information regarding chemical and material processes when achieving sufficient spectral resolution. Beyond the obvious consideration of a sufficiently short pulse width, the dependence of the frequency bandwidth must be accounted for. The equation

Change in wavelength distribution as pulse widths broaden.

ΔνΔt ≥ K

demonstrates that, for any beam shape (K), the beam bandwidth (Δν) is inversely proportional to its pulse width. Therefore, a compromise must be made to achieve maximum resolution in both the time and frequency domains.

The use of high-power lasers with ultrashort pulse widths can create phenomena that obscure weak spectral data, commonly referred to as artifacts. Examples of artifacts include the signal resulting from two-photon absorption and stimulated Raman amplification. Two-photon absorption occurs in samples that are generally transparent to UV-Vis wavelengths of light. These media are able to absorb light efficiently when simultaneously interacting with multiple photons. This causes a change in intensity of the probe pulse.

ΔI_{probe} = γI_{pump}I_{probe}L

The above equation describes the change in intensity relative to the number of photons absorbed (γ) and the thickness of the sample (L). The change in absorption signal resulting from this event has been approximated to the below equation.

S_{approx} = 0.43∙I_{probe}I_{ref}

A common baseline correction technique used in spectroscopy is the penalized root mean square error. A variant of this technique, the asymmetric penalized root mean square, has been used to correct signals affected by artifacts in transient absorption.

=== Conditions ===
TA measurements are highly sensitive to laser repetition rate, pulse duration, emission wavelength, polarization, intensity, sample chemistry, solvents, concentration and temperature. The excitation density (no. of photons per unit area per second) must be kept low; otherwise, sample annihilation, saturation and orientational saturation may come into play.

=== Application ===
Transient absorption spectroscopy helps study the mechanistic and kinetic details of chemical processes occurring on the time scales of a few picoseconds to femtoseconds. These chemical events are initiated by an ultrafast laser pulse and are further probed by a probe pulse. With the help of TA measurements, one can look into non-radiative relaxation of higher electronic states (~femtoseconds), vibrational relaxations (~picoseconds), and radiative relaxation of excited singlet state (occurs typically on a nanoseconds time scale).

Transient absorption spectroscopy can be used to trace the intermediate states in a photochemical reaction; energy, charge, or electron transfer process; conformational changes, thermal relaxation, fluorescence or phosphorescence processes, optical gain spectroscopy of semiconductor laser materials, etc. With the availability of UV-Vis-NIR ultrafast lasers, one can selectively excite a portion of any large molecule to desired excited states to study the specific molecular dynamics, such as photo-protective functions of carotenoids in photosynthesis.

Transient absorption spectroscopy has become an important tool for characterizing various electronic states and energy transfer processes in nanoparticles, to locate trap states, and further helps in characterizing the efficient passivation strategies.

== Other multiple-pulse techniques ==
Transient spectroscopy as discussed above is a technique that involves two pulses. There are many more techniques that employ two or more pulses, such as:

- Photon echoes.
- Four-wave mixing (involves three laser pulses)
- fifth-order experiments (involves four excitation pulses and a probe pulse)

The interpretation of experimental data from these techniques is usually much more complicated than in transient-absorption spectroscopy.

Nuclear magnetic resonance and electron spin resonance are often implemented with multiple-pulse techniques, though with radio waves and micro waves instead of visible light.

== Time-resolved infrared spectroscopy ==
Time-resolved infrared (TRIR) spectroscopy also employs a two-pulse, "pump-probe" methodology. The pump pulse is typically in the UV region and is often generated by a high-powered Nd:YAG laser, whereas the probe beam is in the infrared region. This technique currently operates down to the picosecond time regime and surpasses transient absorption and emission spectroscopy by providing structural information on the excited-state kinetics of both dark and emissive states.

== Time-resolved fluorescence spectroscopy ==
Time-resolved fluorescence spectroscopy is an extension of fluorescence spectroscopy. Here, the fluorescence of a sample is monitored as a function of time after excitation by a flash of light. The time resolution can be obtained in a number of ways, depending on the required sensitivity and time resolution:

- With fast-detection electronics (nanoseconds and slower)
- With Time Correlated Single Photon Counting, TCSPC (picoseconds and slower)
- With a streak camera (picoseconds and slower)
- With intensified CCD (ICCD) cameras (down to 200 picoseconds and slower)
- With optical gating (femtoseconds-nanoseconds) - a short laser pulse acts as a gate for the detection of fluorescence light; only fluorescence light that arrives at the detector at the same time as the gate pulse is detected. This technique has the best time resolution, but the efficiency is rather low. An extension of this optical gating technique is to use a "Kerr gate", which allows the scattered Raman signal to be collected before the (slower) fluorescence signal overwhelms it. This technique can greatly improve the signal:noise ratio of Raman spectra.

This technique uses convolution integral to calculate a lifetime from a fluorescence decay.

== Time-resolved photoemission spectroscopy and 2PPE ==
Time-resolved photoemission spectroscopy and two-photon photoelectron spectroscopy (2PPE) are important extensions to photoemission spectroscopy. These methods employ a pump-probe setup. In most cases the pump and probe are both generated by a pulsed laser and in the UV region. The pump excites the atom or molecule of interest, and the probe ionizes it. The electrons or positive ions resulting from this event are then detected. As the time delay between the pump and the probe are changed, the change in the energy (and sometimes emission direction) of the photo-products is observed. In some cases multiple photons of a lower energy are used as the ionizing probe.

== See also ==
- Time-resolved mass spectrometry
- Ultrafast laser spectroscopy
