= 7JP4 =

Monochrome cathode-ray tube

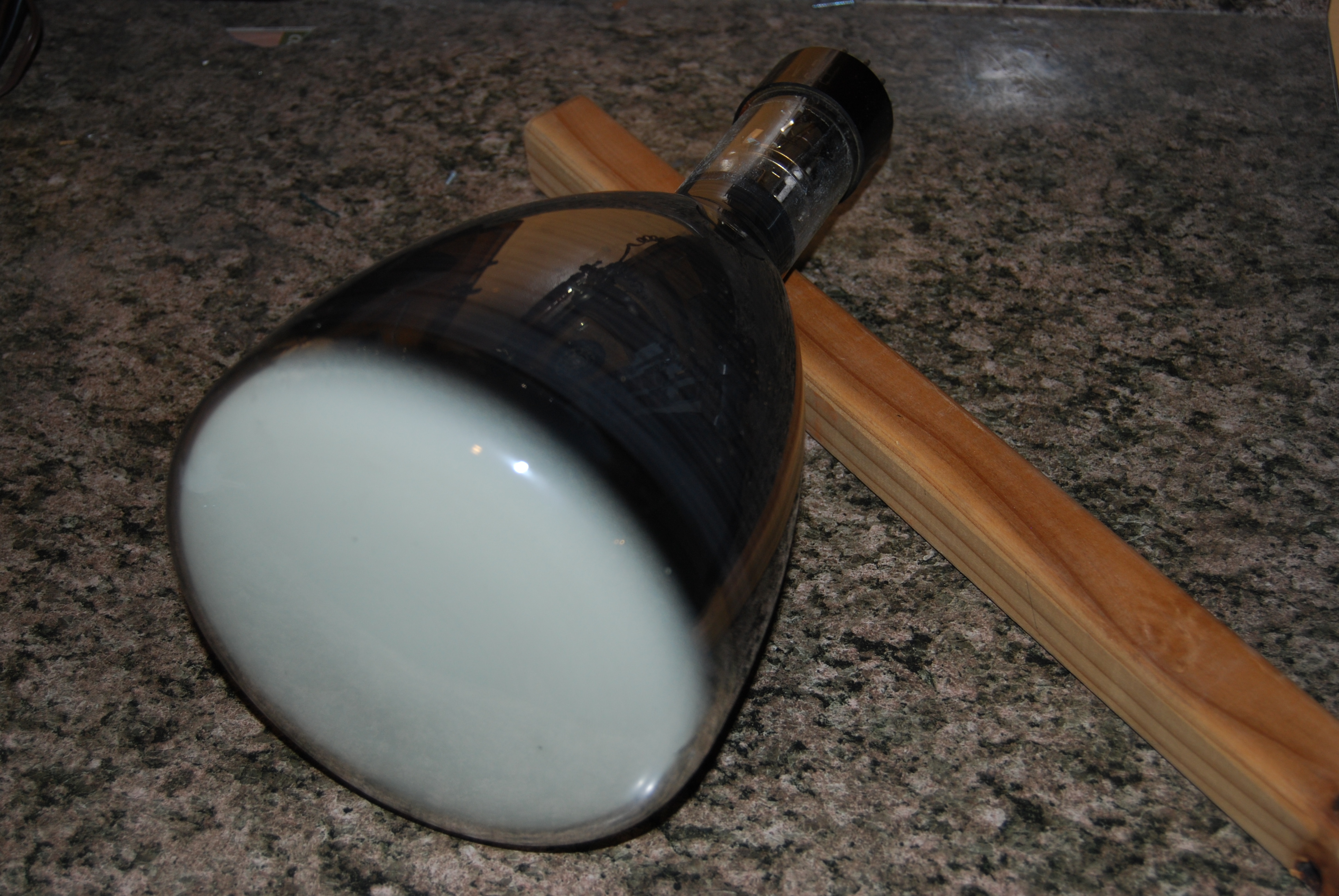
Front View of 7JP4 Electrostatic Television Picture Tube

The 7JP4 is an early black and white or monochrome cathode-ray tube (also called picture tube and kinescope). It was a popular type used in late 1940s low cost and small table model televisions. The 7JP4 has a 7" diameter round screen which was often partially masked. Unlike later electromagnetically deflected TV tubes, the 7JP4 is electrostatically deflected like an oscilloscope tube.

== Development ==
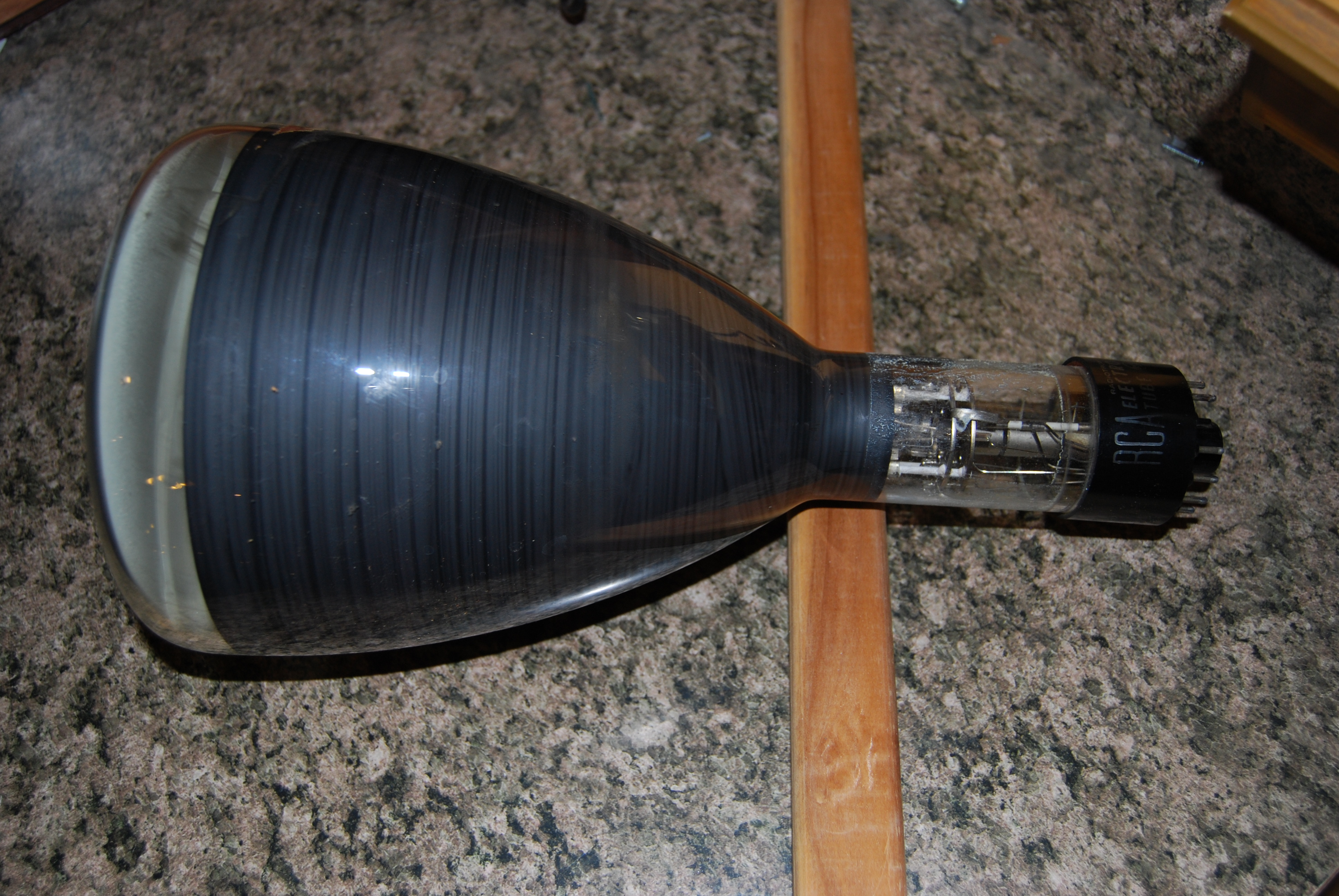
Side View of 7JP4

The 7JP4 is part of the 7JPx series of circular face electrostatic cathode ray tubes (CRT). Originally developed for radar applications as a display device for radar display A scopes around 1944. After World War 2 the CRT was adapted for television applications. There are three versions. The 7JP4 (P4 represents the phosphor that glows white and has medium persistence) for television. For oscilloscope applications the 7JP1 was used (P1 phosphor has a green trace and short persistence). Radar applications the 7JP7 was used (P7 phosphor has a blue-white trace with a long persistence). This CRT was produced by multiple manufacturers (RCA, General Electric, Sylvania Electric Products and Tung-sol). Except for the type of phosphor used all three are identical in operation and connection. The screen diagonal is 7 inches (17.8 cm) for 7JP1 and 7JP4, but only 5.5 inches (14 cm) for the 7JP7.

== 7JP4 electrical characteristics ==
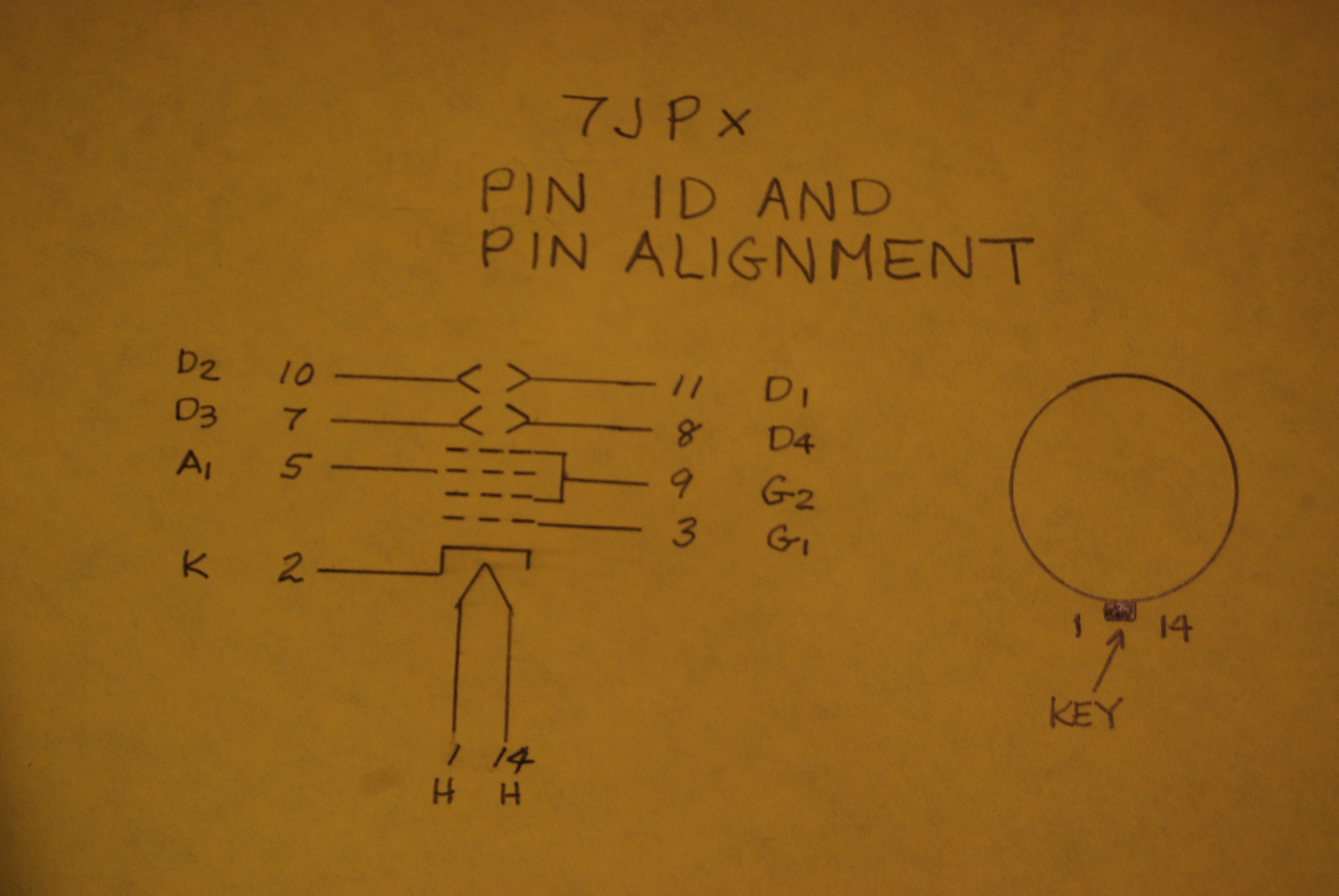
Pin identification and alignment

Some general electrical characteristics are shown below. Second anode + grid 2 (pin 9) and plates (pins 10, 11 and 7, 8) have a maximum value limit of 6000 volts dc. Internal arcing can be expected when this voltage is exceeded. Actual values are typically in the 4000 to 5500 volts range, and some sets were operated as low as 2000 volts dc. Grid 1 (pin 3) can receive either a negative bias or a positive bias. Pin 2 is the brightness voltage; pin 3 is the video signal on top of DC, and pin 2 is a DC level varying with the brightness control. Some sets are backwards and have pin 3 on ground and video on pin 2 along with brightness adjustment.

Parameter	Value
Heater voltage (pins 1 and 14)	6.3 volts
Heater current	0.6 ampere
Plates (pins 10, 11 and 7, 8)	6000 volts DC max.
Cathode K (pin 2)	120 volts DC
First anode (focus) (pin 5)	2800 volts DC
Second anode + grid 2 (pin 9)	6000 volts DC max.
Grid 1 negative bias (pin 3)	200 volts DC
Grid 1 positive bias (pin 3)	0 volts DC
Grid 1 positive peak (pin 3)	2 volts
Vertical plate deflection (pins 10, 11)	216 volts per inch (88 V/cm)
Horizontal plate deflection (pins 7, 8)	177 volts per inch (72 V/cm)

== Early television in the United States ==
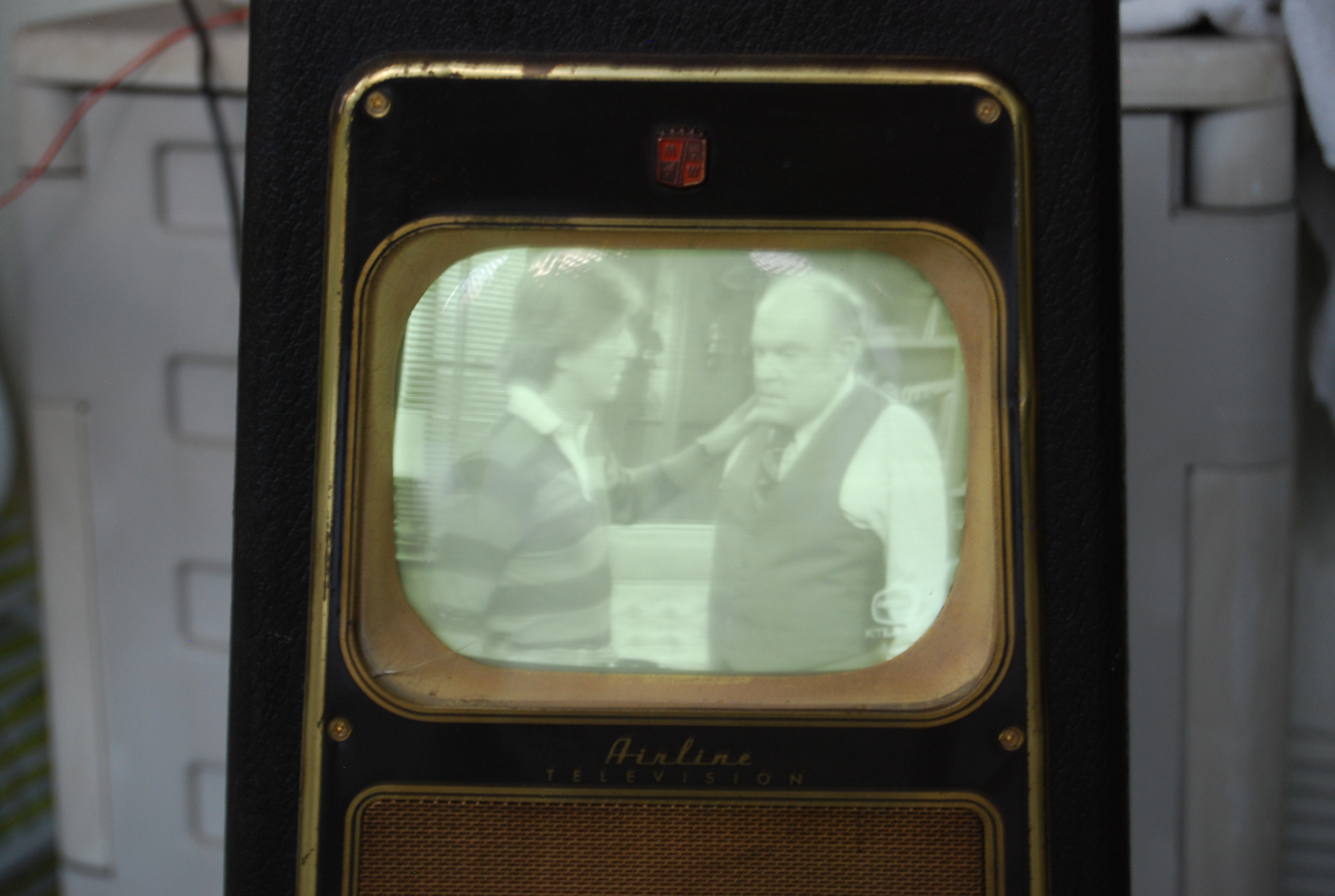
Example of a picture from an electrostatic television using a 7JP4. The television is a Montgomery Ward Airline 84GSE3011A (made by Sentinel Radio and Television Corp.)

From 1946 to 1951 the 7JP4 was a common CRT (picture tube, or kinescope) used in lower priced televisions sold in the United States. These television were popular for portable carry around and small table top sets. These smaller sets were direct view electrostatic deflection designs. This required an extremely high voltage to produce an image across the full display screen. In 1946, RCA influenced manufacturers (with royalty-free circuit designs) to move toward electromagnetic deflection type televisions. Electromagnetic deflection uses varying magnetic fields to produce a full screen image. Horizontal and vertical electromagnets are placed at the picture tube neck, called the "yoke". This method allowed the image to be viewed on larger screens. The first heavily mass-produced large picture tube to use this newer method of deflection was RCA's 10BP4, introduced in 1946. Soon after electrostatic picture tubes and the television electronic design would be completely replaced.

For a detailed look at US electrostatic TV design and the 7JP4 kinescope from an Australian view (by cablehack) go to the external link below involving the Wards Airline TV (Sentinel model 400TV).

== Restoration of dead technology ==
The interest in the 7JPx series of CRT's is in restoration of dead technology. Dead technology represent products that are no longer mass-produced or seriously used. The technology used in these designs have reach their highest level or have been replaced by a better technology. The restoration of early US made television sets has spurred interest in the 7JP4. Since this particular model is no longer made, only available ones are from old stock or from television sets that cannot be restored. This makes the price of a working CRT very expensive.

Because it is electrostatically deflected and was obsolete by the mid-1950s, most CRT testers will not test the 7JP4 and thus it is best tested in a working TV set. The Precision CR30, Sencore CR-70 and Jackson 707 are some of the CRT testers that are capable of testing the 7JP4, 3KP4 and other electrostatic deflection CRTs. Since the availability of these CRT testers is very limited, the prices for such testers are steep, so many restorers test these CRT's on a working TV set that used electrostatic CRTs. There are many picture tube restoring equipment available for magnetic deflection tubes but there is no way to restore electrostatic tubes. The biggest problem with many picture tubes is the loss of emission or electron production due to contaminated or damaged cathode that surrounds the heater.

The 7JP4 was used in the following sets (incomplete list):

Admiral 19A11, 19A12
Motorola VT-71
Motorola VT-73
Hallicrafters 504, 505, T-54
Sentinel TV-400
Sentinel TV-405
National TV-7M & TV-7W
Philco 50-T701 & 50-T702
Tele-Tone TV-149

These and other early television sets can be found in the "Collectors Guide to Vintage Televisions – Identification and Values", by Bryan Durbal and Glenn Bubenheimer (ISBN 1-57432-126-9) published by Collector Books, Paducah, KY, USA.
