= Deflection (physics) =

Change in a moving object's trajectory due to a collision or force field

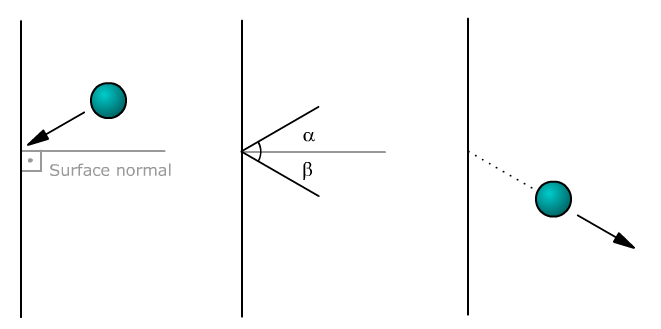
An object hitting a surface is an example of deflection.

Deflection is a change in a moving object's velocity, hence its trajectory, as a consequence of contact (collision) with a surface or the influence of a non-contact force field. Examples of the former include a ball bouncing off the ground or a bat; examples of the latter include a beam of electrons used to produce a picture, quantum deflection, or the relativistic bending of light due to gravity.

== Deflective efficiency ==
An object's deflective efficiency can never equal or surpass 100%, for example:

- a mirror will never reflect exactly the same amount of light cast upon it, though it may concentrate the light which is reflected into a narrower beam.
- on hitting the ground, a ball previously in free-fall (meaning no force other than gravity acted upon it) will never bounce back up to the place where it first started to descend.

This transfer of some energy into heat or other radiation is a consequence of the theory of thermodynamics, where, for every such interaction, some energy must be converted into alternative forms of energy or is absorbed by the deformation of the objects involved in the collision.

== See also ==
- Electrostatic deflection
- Coriolis effect
- Deflection yoke
- Impulse
- Reflection
