= Electrostatic lens =

Device for focusing charged particles

An electrostatic lens is a device that assists in the transport of charged particles. Electrostatic lenses can focus, and also accelerate or decelerate charged particles by creating an electric field that exerts a force on the charged particles. For instance, they are widely used in the extraction and acceleration of electron or ion beams Systems of electrostatic lenses can be designed in the same way as optical lenses, so electrostatic lenses easily magnify or converge the charged particle trajectories. As the focusing properties are independent of the charge-to-mass ratio of the particles at non-relativistic speeds, this means the same system can be used with different ions

== Cylinder lens ==
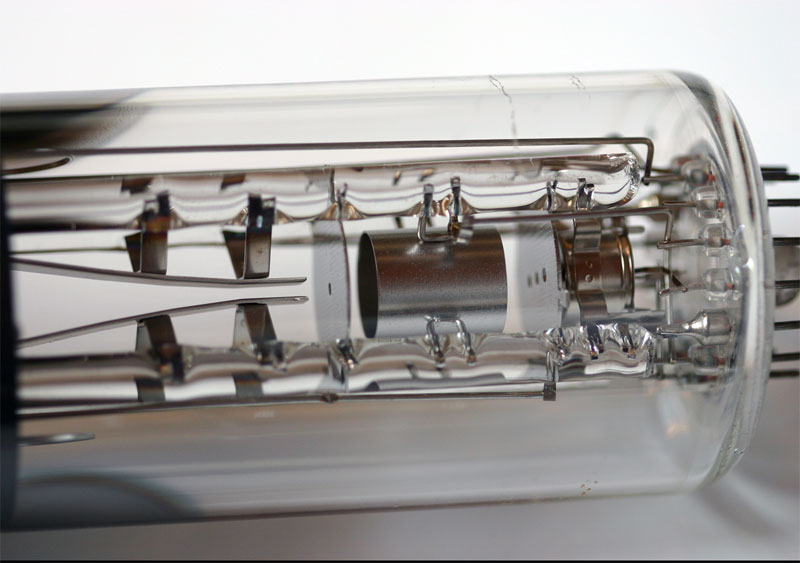
Cylinder lenses in a cathode-ray tube electron gun

A cylinder lens consists of several cylinders whose sides are thin walls. Each cylinder lines up parallel to the optical axis into which electrons enter. There are small gaps put between the cylinders. When each cylinder has a different voltage, the gap between the cylinders works as a lens. The magnification is able to be changed by choosing different voltage combinations. Although the magnification of two cylinder lenses can be changed, the focal point is also changed by this operation. Three cylinder lenses achieve the change of the magnification while holding the object and image positions because there are two gaps that work as lenses. Although the voltages have to change depending on the electron kinetic energy, the voltage ratio is kept constant when the optical parameters are not changed.

While a charged particle is in an electric field force acts upon it. The faster the particle the smaller the accumulated impulse. For a collimated beam the focal length is given as the initial impulse divided by the accumulated (perpendicular) impulse by the lens. This makes the focal length of a single lens a function of the second order of the speed of the charged particle. Single lenses as known from photonics are not easily available for electrons.

The cylinder lens consists of defocusing lens, a focusing lens and a second defocusing lens, with the sum of their refractive powers being zero. But because there is some distance between the lenses, the electron makes three turns and hits the focusing lens at a position farther away from the axis and so travels through a field with greater strength. This indirectness leads to the fact that the resulting refractive power is the square of the refractive power of a single lens.

== Einzel lens ==
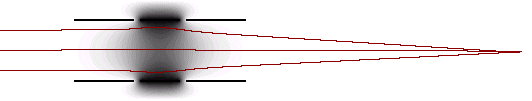
Path of ions in an einzel lens.

An einzel lens is an electrostatic lens that can focus without changing the energy of the beam. It consists of three or more sets of cylindrical or rectangular tubes in series along an axis.

== Quadrupole lens ==
The quadrupole lens consists of two single quadrupoles turned 90° with respect to each other. Let z be the optical axis then one can deduce separately for the x and the y axis that the refractive power is again the square of the refractive power of a single lens.

A magnetic quadrupole works very similar to an electric quadrupole, however the Lorentz force increases with the velocity of the charged particle. In spirit of a Wien filter, a combined magnetic, electric quadrupole is achromatic around a given velocity. Bohr and Pauli claim that this lens leads to aberration when applied to ions with spin (in the sense of chromatic aberration), but not when applied to electrons which also have a spin. See Stern–Gerlach experiment.

== Multipole lenses ==
Multipoles beyond the quadrupole can correct for spherical aberration and in particle accelerators the dipole bending magnets are really composed of a large number of elements with different superpositions of multipoles.

Usually the dependency is given for the kinetic energy itself depending on the power of the velocity. So for an electrostatic lens the focal length varies with the second power of the kinetic energy, while for a magnetostatic lens the focal length varies proportional to the kinetic energy. And a combined quadrupole can be achromatic around a given energy.

If a distribution of particles with different kinetic energies is accelerated by a longitudinal electric field, the relative energy spread is reduced leading to less chromatic error. An example of this is in the electron microscope.

== See also ==
- Ion funnel – Device used to focus a beam of ions
- Magnetic lens – Lens for charged particles
- SIMION
