= Einzel lens =

Focused beam with lossless energy

Implementation of an einzel lens showing the ion path. Six plates are parallel to the ion flight path with the middle plate at a particular potential.

An einzel lens (from German: Einzellinse – single lens), or unipotential lens, is a charged particle electrostatic lens that focuses without changing the energy of the beam. It consists of three or more sets of cylindrical or rectangular apertures or tubes in series along an axis. It is used in ion optics to focus ions in flight, which is accomplished through manipulation of the electric field in the path of the ions.

The electrostatic potential in the lens is symmetric, so the ions will regain their initial energy on exiting the lens, although the velocity of the outer particles will be altered such that they converge on to the axis. This causes the outer particles to arrive at the focus intersection slightly later than the ones that travel along a straight path, as they have to travel an extra distance.

== Theory ==
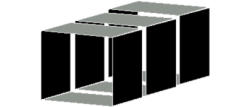
A perspective view of an einzel lens.

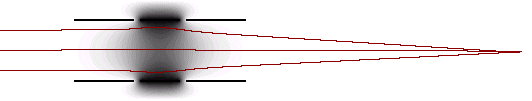
Path of ions as they travel through an einzel lens. The ion mass is 200 kDa accelerated to 40 kV, the middle plate potential is at 200 V, and the plate size is 1 m (note that these values are atypical for illustrative purposes).

The equation for the change in radial velocity for a particle as it passes between any pair of cylinders in the lens is:

$\Delta v_r = \int \frac{qE_r(r,z)}{m v_z} dz,$

with z axis passing through the middle of the lens, and r being the direction normal to z. If the lens is constructed with cylindrical electrodes, the field is symmetrical around z. $E_r(r,z)$ is the magnitude of the electric field in the radial direction for a particle at a particular radial distance and distance across the gap, $m$ is the mass of the particle passing through the field, $v_z$ is the velocity of the particle and q is the charge of the particle. The integral occurs over the gap between the plates. This is also the interval where the lensing occurs.

The pair of plates is also called an electrostatic immersion lens, thus an einzel lens can be described as two or more electrostatic immersion lenses. Solving the equation above twice to find the change in radial velocity for each pair of plates can be used to calculate the focal length of the lens.

== Application to television tubes ==
The einzel lens principle in a simplified form was also used as a focusing mechanism in display and television cathode ray tubes, and has the advantage of providing a good sharply focused spot throughout the useful life of the tube's electron gun, with minimal or no readjustment needed (many monochrome TVs did not have or need focus controls), although in high-resolution monochrome displays and all colour CRT displays a (technician-adjustable) focus potentiometer control is provided.

== See also ==
- Time of flight
- Mass spectrometry
- Cathode ray tube
- Wehnelt cylinder
