= TIMA =

- Uses: Automated mineral identification; Quantification and textural analysis
- Manufacturer: Tescan
- Components: Scanning electron microscope; Energy-dispersive X-ray detectors; Backscattered-electron detector; TIMA data acquisition and processing software

TIMA (Tescan Integrated Mineral Analyzer) is an automated mineral analysis system manufactured by the Czech company Tescan. It combines scanning electron microscopy, backscattered-electron imaging and energy-dispersive X-ray spectroscopy with software to identify and quantify minerals in solid samples. The system produces mineral maps and data on mineral abundance, grain size, mineral associations (contacts between neighboring minerals) and liberation (the extent to which a mineral occurs separately from other minerals within particles).

TIMA was introduced in 2011. It is used in mineral processing and geological research, including the characterization of ores and petroleum reservoir rocks. The system has also been applied to extraterrestrial materials such as lunar soil returned by the Chang'e-5 mission.

== History ==
TIMA's mineral analysis software was introduced in 2011. The TIMA system used Tescan's MIRA and VEGA scanning electron microscope platforms. In 2021, Tescan released a new generation of TIMA, which shared its hardware platform with the MIRA G4 field-emission scanning electron microscope.

== Design and operation ==
=== Instrumentation ===
TIMA combines a scanning electron microscope with backscattered-electron (BSE) and secondary-electron detectors, energy-dispersive X-ray (EDS) silicon drift detectors and software for automated data acquisition. TIMA instruments have used either field-emission or tungsten-filament electron sources, with one to four EDS detectors. Multiple EDS detectors increase the rate of X-ray collection and reduce shadowing from uneven sample surfaces. TIMA sample holders accommodate batches of thin sections or polished blocks.

Rock sections and grain mounts are typically polished to expose a flat surface and given a conductive coating to reduce charging. Surface preparation affects focusing and the quality of BSE and EDS data.

=== Mineral identification and quantification ===
TIMA identifies mineral phases using BSE image contrast and EDS spectra. BSE contrast reflects differences in average atomic number, while EDS spectra provide information on elemental composition. The software uses these measurements and a mineral classification scheme to assign phase identities and generate a two-dimensional mineral map. Stored measurements can be reprocessed after the classification scheme is revised.

The software reports mineral abundances as volume percentages and converts them to mass percentages using assigned phase densities. These abundances and assigned phase compositions are used to calculate bulk chemical composition and elemental deportment, or the distribution of individual elements among mineral phases. Spatial data provide grain and particle size distributions, mineral associations and liberation. The software can export grain coordinates for subsequent electron probe microanalysis or laser ablation inductively coupled plasma mass spectrometry (LA-ICP-MS).

These surface measurements do not directly describe the complete three-dimensional structure of the sample; two-dimensional sections can lead to errors in estimates of mineral size and spatial relationships. Quantification also depends on whether the analyzed surface represents the sample.

Identification accuracy depends on how well the classification library represents the minerals and compositional variations present in the sample. Generic libraries can leave phases unclassified or misidentify them; refinement can also be checked using complementary techniques such as electron probe microanalysis. Phases with similar chemical compositions can be difficult to distinguish. Small intergrown mineral grains and mineral boundaries can produce mixed EDS signals, which the software attempts to classify by matching the resulting spectra against adjacent phases. Although EDS cannot directly detect elements such as hydrogen and lithium, phases containing these elements can still be identified based on the proportions of other detectable elements. Low elemental concentrations and overlapping X-ray peaks can also limit chemical quantification.

=== Measurement modes ===
TIMA uses four acquisition modes:

1. High-resolution mapping collects BSE signals and EDS spectra at each point on a regular grid over the selected material.
2. Point spectrometry uses BSE contrast to identify regions and collects one EDS spectrum per region. This reduces acquisition time but can misclassify adjacent phases with similar BSE brightness and different chemical compositions.
3. Line mapping collects BSE and EDS data along regularly spaced lines. It reduces acquisition time and retains some textural information, but does not produce complete two-dimensional mineral maps.
4. Dot mapping collects BSE data on a finer grid and EDS spectra on a coarser grid. Each detected region receives at least one EDS measurement, including regions smaller than the EDS grid spacing.

These acquisition modes are used within separate analysis types. Modal analysis measures mineral abundances, while liberation analysis collects mineralogical and textural information. Bright phase search targets phases selected by BSE intensity, chemical composition or both, with an option to analyze surrounding material. Section analysis maps phases in thin sections or polished rock surfaces without detecting individual particles.

== Applications ==
TIMA has been used in:

- Ore characterization and mineral processing to quantify mineral abundances and the distribution of metals among mineral phases. Liberation and association data are used to model particle behavior during physical separation. A study of nickel–cobalt laterites from Wingellina, Western Australia, used TIMA to identify the phases hosting nickel and cobalt.
- Mineral exploration to analyze minerals in drill chips that indicate potential mineralized systems, even when the samples do not contain the target mineral.
- Mineral provenance analysis as part of an analytical fingerprinting workflow for mineral concentrates at the African Minerals and Geosciences Centre. The workflow combines mineralogical analysis with LA-ICP-MS and statistical comparison to determine whether a shipment's declared origin is plausible.
- Geological research to investigate sulfide mineralization and the crystallization of granitic rocks. TIMA mineral maps have also been correlated with X-ray micro-computed tomography data to interpret mineral relationships in three dimensions.
- Petroleum geology to map minerals in sandstone and shale and examine mineralogical and pore-structure changes in treated reservoir rocks.
- Environmental research to quantify the distribution of arsenic, copper, lead and zinc among mineral and glass phases in particles extracted from soils contaminated by mining and smelting. It has also been used to characterize respirable coal-mine dust, distinguishing chemically different components within individual dust particles.
- Recycling research to characterize processed material from spent lithium-ion batteries, measuring the composition, associations and liberation of components such as graphite, metal foils and electrode materials.
- Construction materials research to characterize copper-mine waste rock evaluated for the production of manufactured sand.
- Archaeology to analyze sediments from Boodie Cave on Barrow Island, Western Australia. Mineral mapping helped distinguish stratigraphic units and investigate sediment sources.
- Planetary science to analyze lunar soil returned by Chang'e-5, quantifying mineral and glass abundances.
