= Milford (surname) =

Milford is a surname, and may refer to:

- Anthony Milford (born 1994), Samoan rugby league footballer
- Bliss Milford (1886–1970), American actress and singer
- Dale Milford (1926–1997), American politician from Texas
- Dan Milford (1876–1950), British trade unionist
- Dick Milford (1895–1987), English Anglican priest and Oxfam founder
- Edward Milford (1894–1972), Australian Army officer
- Gene Milford (1902–1991), American film and television editor
- Harold Milford (1914–1944), British aviator
- Henry Milford (1833–1888), Australian politician in Queensland and New South Wales
- Humphrey Sumner Milford (1877–1952), English publisher and editor
- H. C. Milford (1932–2018), American insurance executive and politician from Missouri
- Jake Milford (1914–1984), Canadian ice hockey player and manager
- John Milford (1927–2000), American film and television actor
- Karl Milford (born 1950), Austrian economist
- Kim Milford (1951–1988), American singer-songwriter
- Laloa Milford (born 1976), Samoan rugby league and rugby union footballer
- Mary Beth Milford (1904–1982), American actress and dancer
- Nancy Milford (1938–2022), American biographer
- Penelope Milford (1948–2025), American actress
- Robin Milford (1903–1959), English composer, son of Humphrey Sumner Milford
- Roger Milford (born 1940), British football referee
- Samuel Milford (1797–1865), Australian judge

== See also ==
- Malford
- Melford (surname)
- Mulford (surname)
