= Melford (surname) =

Melford is a surname, and may refer to:

- Austin Melford (1884–1971), British screenwriter and film director
- Clare Melford, English businessperson
- David Melford (born 1927), British metallurgist
- George Melford (1877–1961), American actor and director
- Jack Melford (1899–1972), British actor
- Jill Melford (1931–2018), British actress, daughter of Jack Melford
- Mark Melford (c.1850–1914), British author, actor and variety artist
- Michael Melford (journalist) (1916–1999), British sportswriter
- Michael Melford (photographer) (born 1950), American photographer, artist and teacher
- Michael Melford (rugby union) (born 1984), English rugby union footballer
- Myra Melford (born 1957), American jazz pianist and composer
- William Melford (1876–1962), American football player and coach

== See also ==
- Malford
- Milford (surname)
- Mulford
