= Oolitic =

Oolitic may refer to:

- Oolite, a sedimentary rock consisting of ooids
- Oolitic, Indiana, a town whose name came from the underlying limestone
- Oolitic aragonite sand, which is formed naturally, and used extensively in reef aquariums
