= Pisolite =

Sedimentary rock made of large grains, usually of calcium carbonate

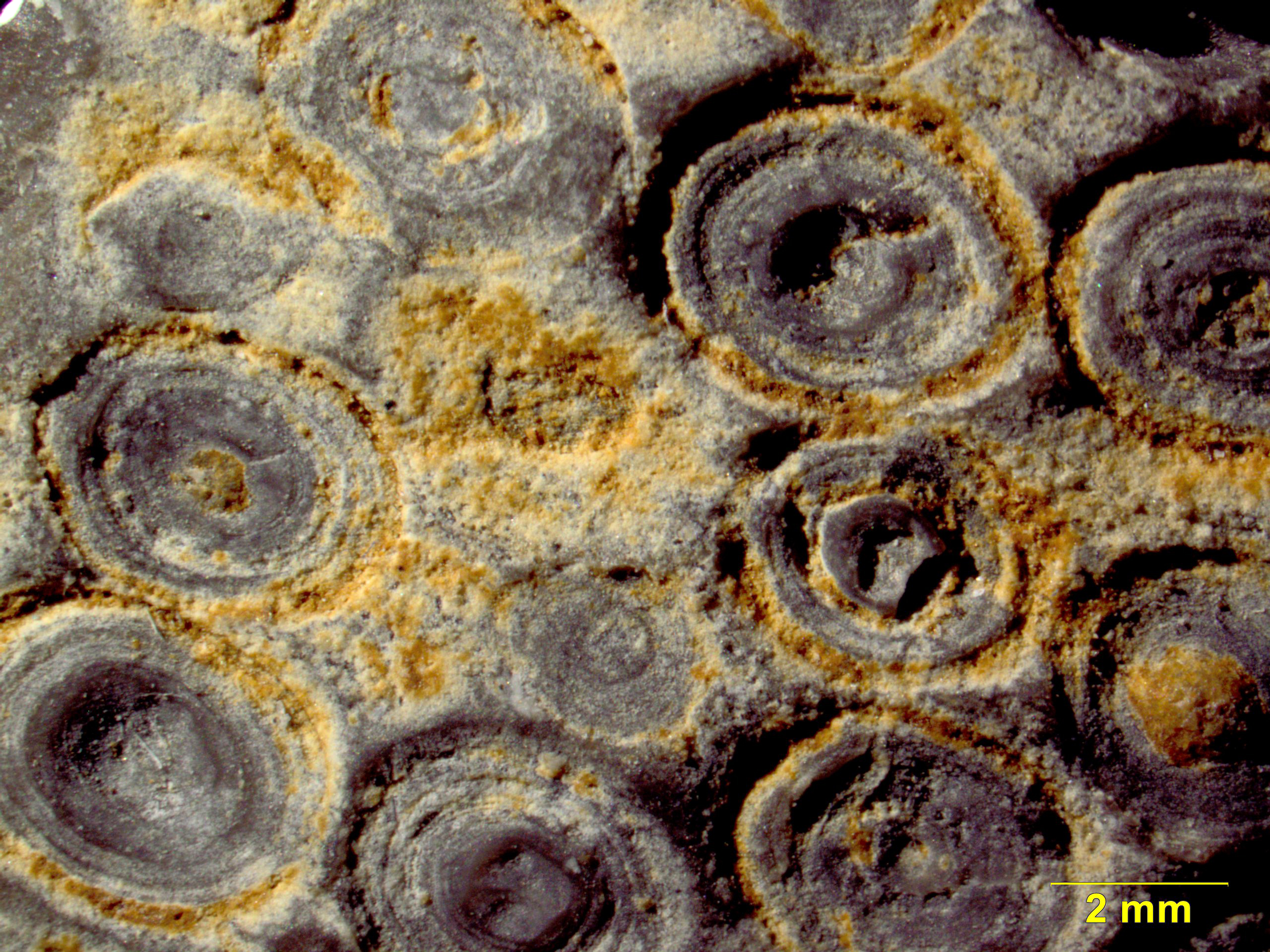
Pisoids in the Conococheague limestone (Upper Cambrian) of eastern Pennsylvania

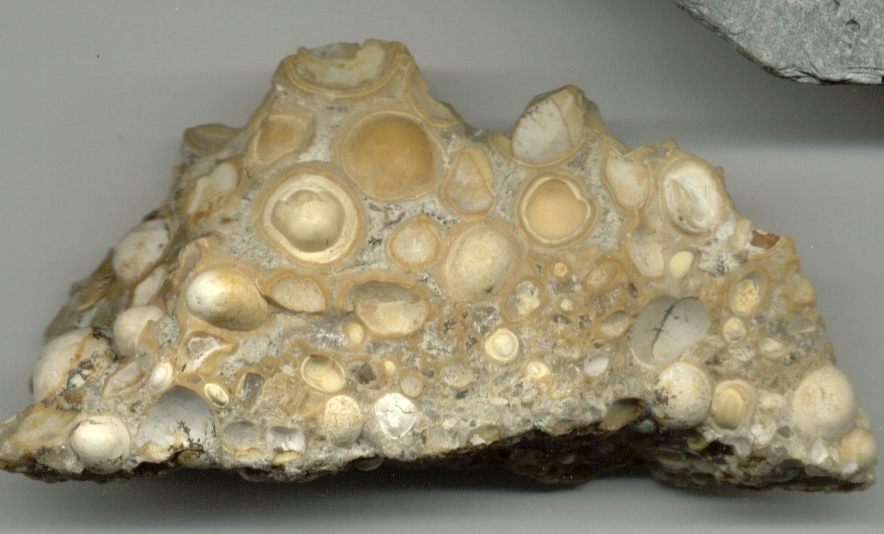
Pisolitic limestone; Itaboraí, Rio de Janeiro, Brazil; pisolith diameters average 1.0 cm

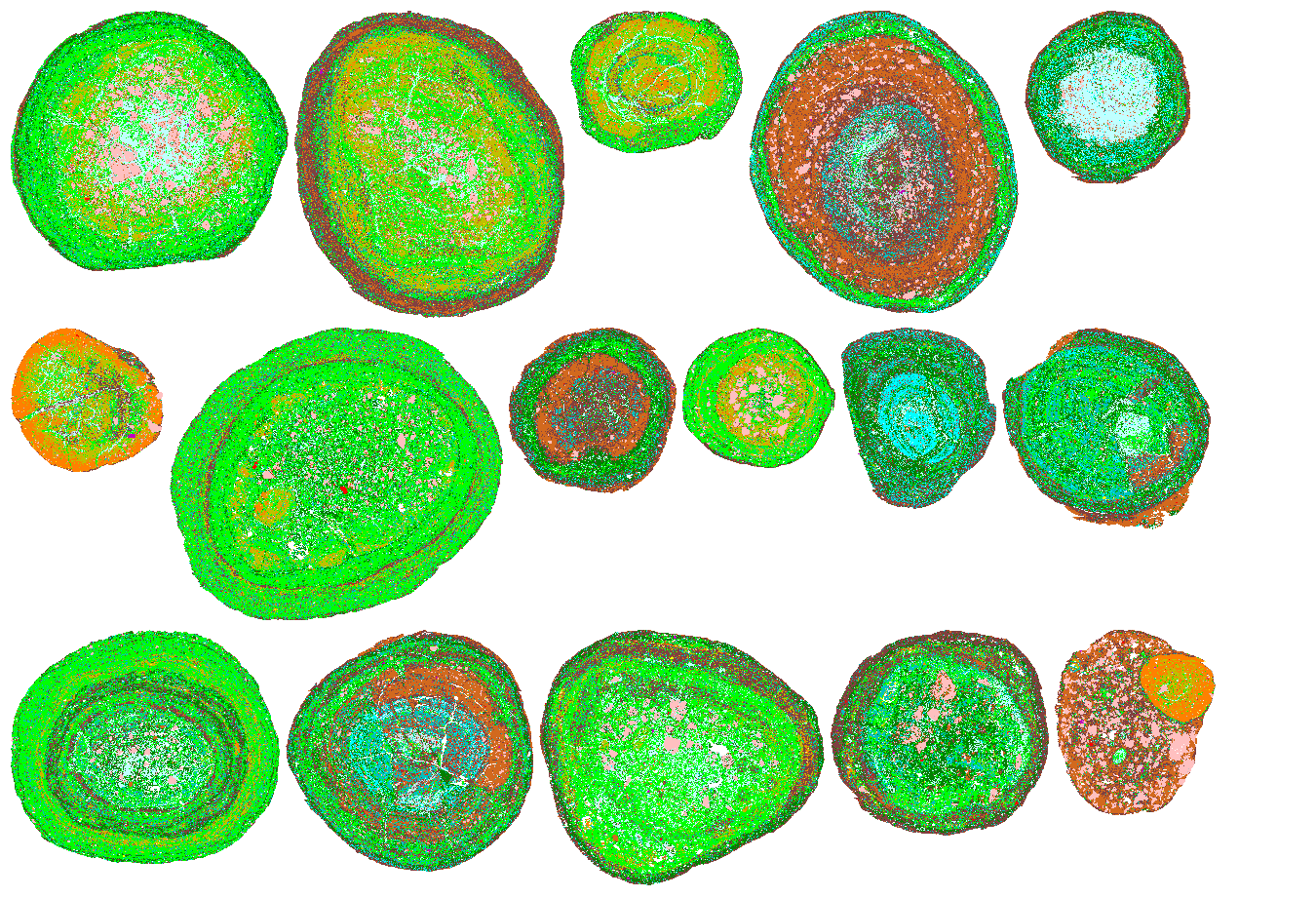
QEMSCAN mineral map of bauxite forming pisoids

A pisolite (from Ancient Greek πίσον (píson) 'pea') is a sedimentary rock made of pisoids, which are concretionary grains – typically of calcium carbonate which resemble ooids, but are more than 2 mm in diameter. These grains are approximately spherical and have concentric layers reaching 10 mm in diameter.

Bauxites, limonites, and siderites often have a pisolitic structure.

== See also ==
- Ooid
- Oolite
