= Automated mineralogy =

Automated mineralogy is a generic term describing a range of analytical solutions, areas of commercial enterprise, and a growing field of scientific research and engineering applications involving largely automated and quantitative analysis of minerals, rocks and man-made materials.

== Technology ==
Automated mineralogy analytical solutions are characterised by integrating largely automated measurement techniques based on Scanning Electron Microscopy (SEM) and Energy-dispersive X-ray spectroscopy (EDS). Commercially available lab-based solutions include QEMSCAN and Mineral Liberation Analyzer (MLA) from FEI Company, Mineralogic from Zeiss, AZtecMineral from Oxford Instruments, the TIMA (Tescan integrated mineral analyzer) from TESCAN, AMICS from Bruker, and MaipSCAN from Rock Scientific. The first oil & gas wellsite solution was launched jointly by Zeiss and CGG Veritas in 2011 called RoqSCAN. This was followed approximately 6 months later by the release of QEMSCAN Wellsite by FEI Company. More recently in 2016, a ruggedized mine site solution for mining and mineral processing was launched by Zeiss called MinSCAN.

== Business ==
The business of automated mineralogy is concerned with the commercialisation of the technology and software in terms of development and marketing of integrated solutions. This includes all aspects of: service; maintenance; customer support; R&D; marketing and sales. Customers of automated mineralogy solutions include: laboratory facilities; mine sites, well sites, and research institutions.

== Applications ==
Automated mineralogy solutions are applied in a variety of fields requiring statistically reliable, quantitative mineralogical information. These include the following sectors: mining; O&G; coal; environmental sciences; forensic geosciences; archaeology;agribusiness; built environment and planetary geology.

== History of the use of the term ==
The first recorded use of the term automated mineralogy in technical journals can be traced back to seminal papers in the late eighties early nineties describing QEMSCAN technology and applications. The term gained significant popularity after it was used to name a new international conference in July 2006.

== See also ==
- QEMSCAN - Quantitative Evaluation of Minerals by SCANning electron microscopy
