= Melford =

Melford may refer to:

== Places ==
- Melford (Mitchellville, Maryland), historic plantation home at Bowie, Prince George's County, Maryland, USA
- Melford, Nova Scotia, small community in the Canadian province of Nova Scotia, in Inverness County
- Long Melford, large village and civil parish in the county of Suffolk, England
  - Melford Rural District, a former district of West Suffolk
  - Melford Hall, stately home in the village of Long Melford, Suffolk, England
- Middle Melford, Nova Scotia, small community in the Canadian province of Nova Scotia, in Guysborough County

== Given name ==
- Melford Okilo (1933–2008), Nigerian politician
- Melford Spiro (1920–2014), American cultural anthropologist specializing in psychological anthropology
- Melford Stevenson (1902–1987), British lawyer and High Court judge who served in many high-profile cases

== Surname ==
- Melford (surname)
