= David Melford =

British metallurgist (born 1927)

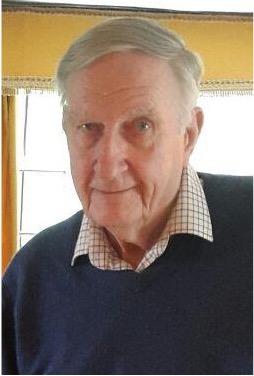
- Born: 16 October 1927 (age 98); London
- Citizenship: British
- Education: Cambridge University
- Known for: Scanning Electron Probe Microanalyser
- Awards: OBE 1990, Hadfield Medal 1975, Pfeil medal 1976, Platinum medal 1993,
- Scientific career
- Workplaces: Tube Investments Research Laboratories, Royal Academy of Engineering visiting professor at Department of Materials Science, Cambridge University
- Thesis: BA, PhD, ScD
- Doctoral advisor: T.P. Hoar

David Melford, OBE (born 16 October 1927) is a British metallurgist and materials scientist, and Fellow of the Royal Academy of Engineering. He co-developed the Scanning Electron MicroAnalyser, along with Peter Duncumb, and served as director of research at Tube Investments Group, the British Engineering Conglomerate. In this capacity he made significant contributions to metals and materials development including the solidification of ingots, the magnetic stirring of molten steels, and engineered surface treatments. He served as Senior Vice President of the Institute of Metals, overseeing its merger with the Plastics and Rubber institute to create the Institute of Materials, and held various senior advisory roles in government, at the Department of Trade and Industry (DTI) and the Science and Engineering Research Council (SERC).

== Early life and education ==
David Melford was born on 16 October 1927, the second son of writer, film and theatre director, Austin Melford, and the actress Jessie Winter, and younger brother of the sports writer Michael Melford. He attended Charterhouse School, serving between 1946 as 1948 as 2nd Lieutenant in the Royal Signals, before reading Natural Sciences at the University of Cambridge. He went on to research, gaining a PhD under the supervision of T.P Hoar, investigating new methods for determining the surface tension of molten metals, including the first measurement of the surface tension of molten Indium, in 1956. In 1981 he was awarded an ScD degree, by the University of Cambridge, and elected Fellow of the Royal Academy of Engineering in 1984.

== Selected publications ==
- Melford, D.A (1958). "The metallographic application of x-ray scanning microanalysis". Metallurgica. 57 (341): 159–161.
- Melford, D.A. (1959). "The X-ray Scanning Microanalyser". New Scientist. 6: 746.
- Melford, D.A. (1963). "Topography, Composition and Structure: a survey of some modern metallographic techniques". Metallography, Iron & Steel Special Report. 80 – via Sorby Centenary Meeting.
- Melford, D.A. (1980). "Influence of residual and trace elements on hot shortness and high temperature embrittlement". Phil Trans R Soc A. A295: 89–103.

== Appointments held ==
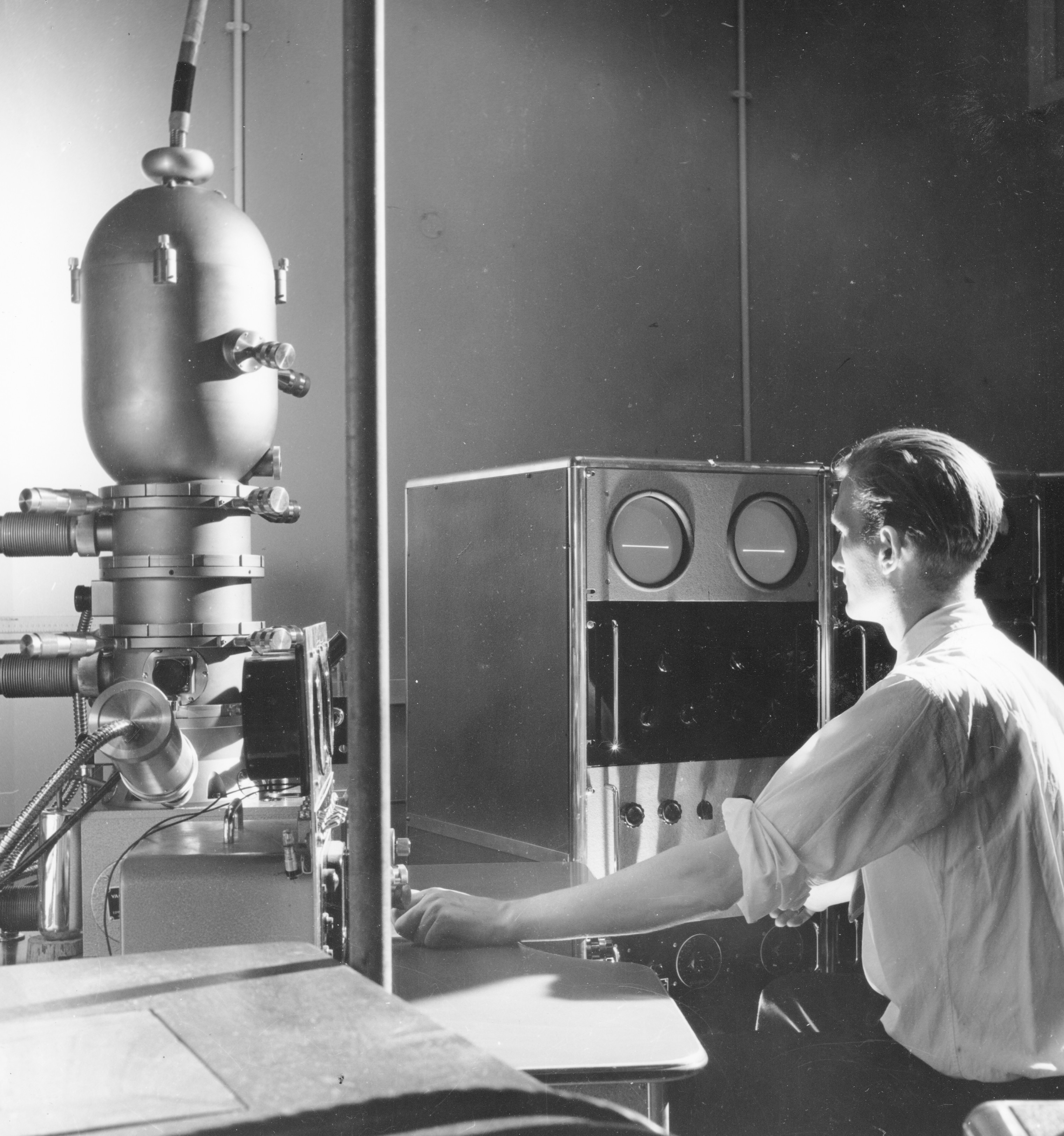
Melford at the controls of the first scanning electron microanalyser, c 1959

Tube investments Research Laboratories, Hinxton Hall (1957–87) Director of Research and Deputy Director and General Manager (1980–87). In this role, Melford designed (with P. Duncumb) the first scanning electron probe microanalyser for metallurgical applications. The mircoanalyser, first presented at the Symposium on X-ray Microscopy and Microanalysis, in Stockholm, 1959, found wide application in metallurgy. Melford and Duncumb immediately applied it to study hot shortness in mild steel solidification of ingots, non-metallic inclusion distribution and other problems.

Senior Vice president, Institute of Metals 1987-8.

Chairman, Materials Advisory Committee, Department of Trade and Industry 1982-87.

Assessor for the Fellowship of Engineering on the Science and Engineering Research Council (SERC).
