= Ooid =

Small sedimentary grain that forms on shallow tropical seabeds

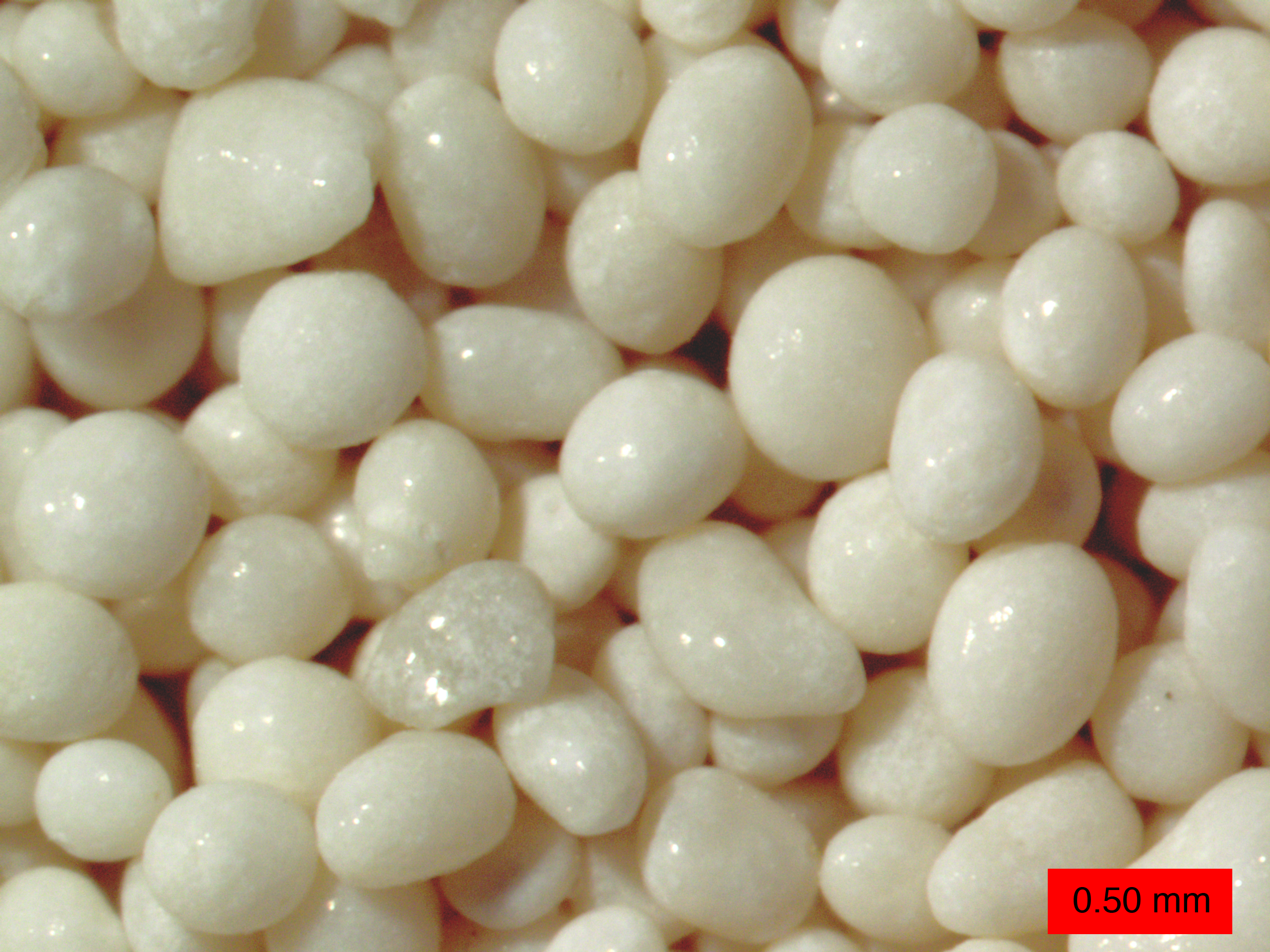
Modern ooids from a beach on Joulter Cays, The Bahamas.

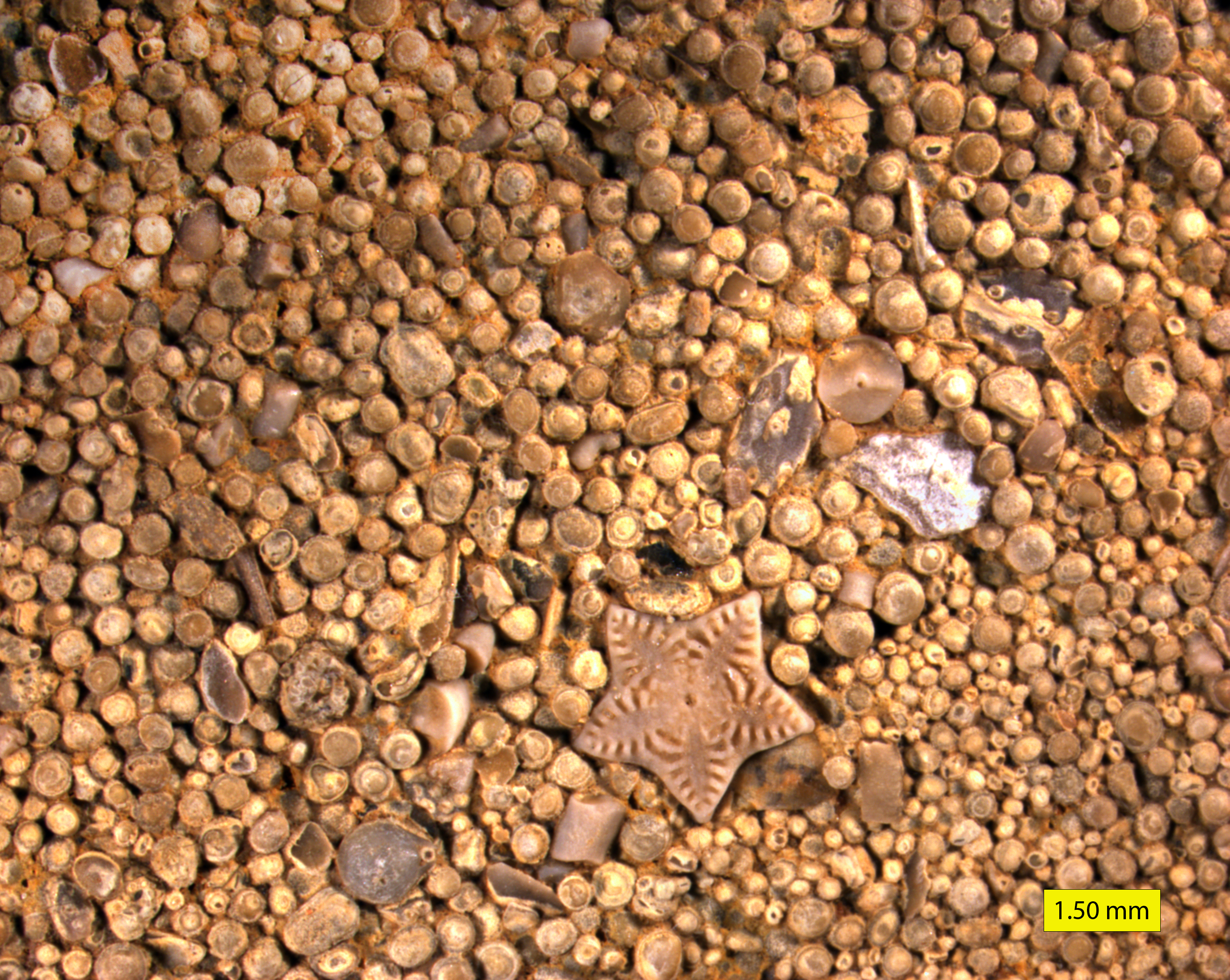
Ooids on the surface of limestone; Carmel Formation (Middle Jurassic) of southern Utah, USA.

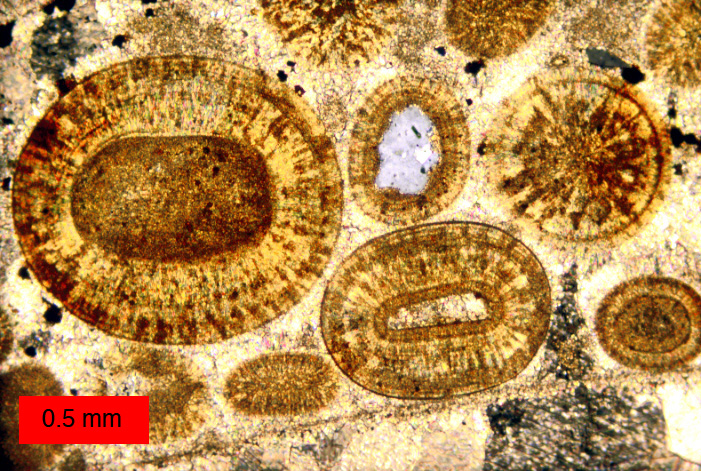
A thin slice of calcitic ooids from the Carmel Formation, Middle Jurassic, of southern Utah, USA.

Ooids (/ˈoʊˌɔɪd/, from Ancient Greek ᾠόν (ōión) 'egg stone') are small (commonly ≤2 mm in diameter), spheroidal, "coated" (layered) sedimentary grains, usually composed of calcium carbonate, but sometimes made up of iron- or phosphate-based minerals. Ooids usually form on the sea floor, most commonly in shallow tropical seas (around the Bahamas, for example, or in the Persian Gulf). After being buried under additional sediment, these ooid grains can be cemented together to form a sedimentary rock called an oolite. Oolites usually consist of calcium carbonate; these belong to the limestone rock family. Pisoids are similar to ooids, but are larger than 2 mm in diameter, often considerably larger, as with the pisoids in the hot springs at Carlsbad (Karlovy Vary) in the Czech Republic. Ooids have been the subject of scientific research for centuries.

== Formation ==
An ooid forms as a series of concentric layers around a nucleus. The layers contain crystals arranged radially, tangentially or randomly. The nucleus can be a shell fragment, quartz grain or any other small fragment. Most modern ooids are aragonite, a polymorph of calcium carbonate; some are composed of high-magnesium calcite, and some are bimineralic (layers of calcite and aragonite). Ancient ooids can be calcitic, either originally precipitated as calcite (as in calcite seas), or formed by alteration (neomorphic replacement) of aragonitic ooids (or the aragonite layers in originally bimineralic ooids). Moldic ooids (or molds later filled in by calcite cement) occur in both young and ancient rocks, indicating the removal of a soluble polymorph (usually aragonite).

== Variation ==
Whether ooids become calcitic or aragonitic can be linked to strontium/calcium substitution within the crystalline structure. This has been shown in some examples to be due to temperature fluctuations in marine environments, which affects salinity levels, which in turn facilitate the substitution. Marine calcitic ooids were typically formed during calcite sea intervals, especially during the Ordovician and the Jurassic Periods. The geochemistry of these seas was a function of seafloor spreading and fluctuating Mg/Ca ratios. Low Mg/Ca ratios favor the precipitation of low-magnesium calcite.

== Growth mode ==
Ooids with radial crystals (such as the aragonitic ooids in the Great Salt Lake, Utah, US) grow by ions extending the lattices of the radial crystals. The mode of growth of ooids with tangential (usually minute needle-like) crystals is less clear. They may be accumulated in a "snowball" fashion from tiny crystals in the sediment or water, or they may crystallize in place on the ooid surface. A hypothesis of growth by accretion (like a snowball) from the polymineralic sediment of fine aragonite, high-magnesium calcite (HMC) and low-magnesium calcite (LMC), must explain how only aragonite needles are added to the ooid cortex. Both in tangential and in radial ooids, the cortex is composed of many very fine increments of growth. Some modern (and ancient) ooids partially or totally lack clear layering and have a micritic (very fine grained) texture. Examination of such micritic ooids by scanning electron microscopy often shows evidence of microbial borings later filled by fine cement.

== Growth factors ==
There are several factors that affect ooid growth: supersaturation of the water with respect to calcium carbonate, the availability of nuclei, agitation of the ooids, water depth, and the role of microbes. There is debate about the amount of organic influence in the formation and growth of ooids. Modern ooids forming statically in situ within microbial mats have been described, supporting organic influence in ooid growth.

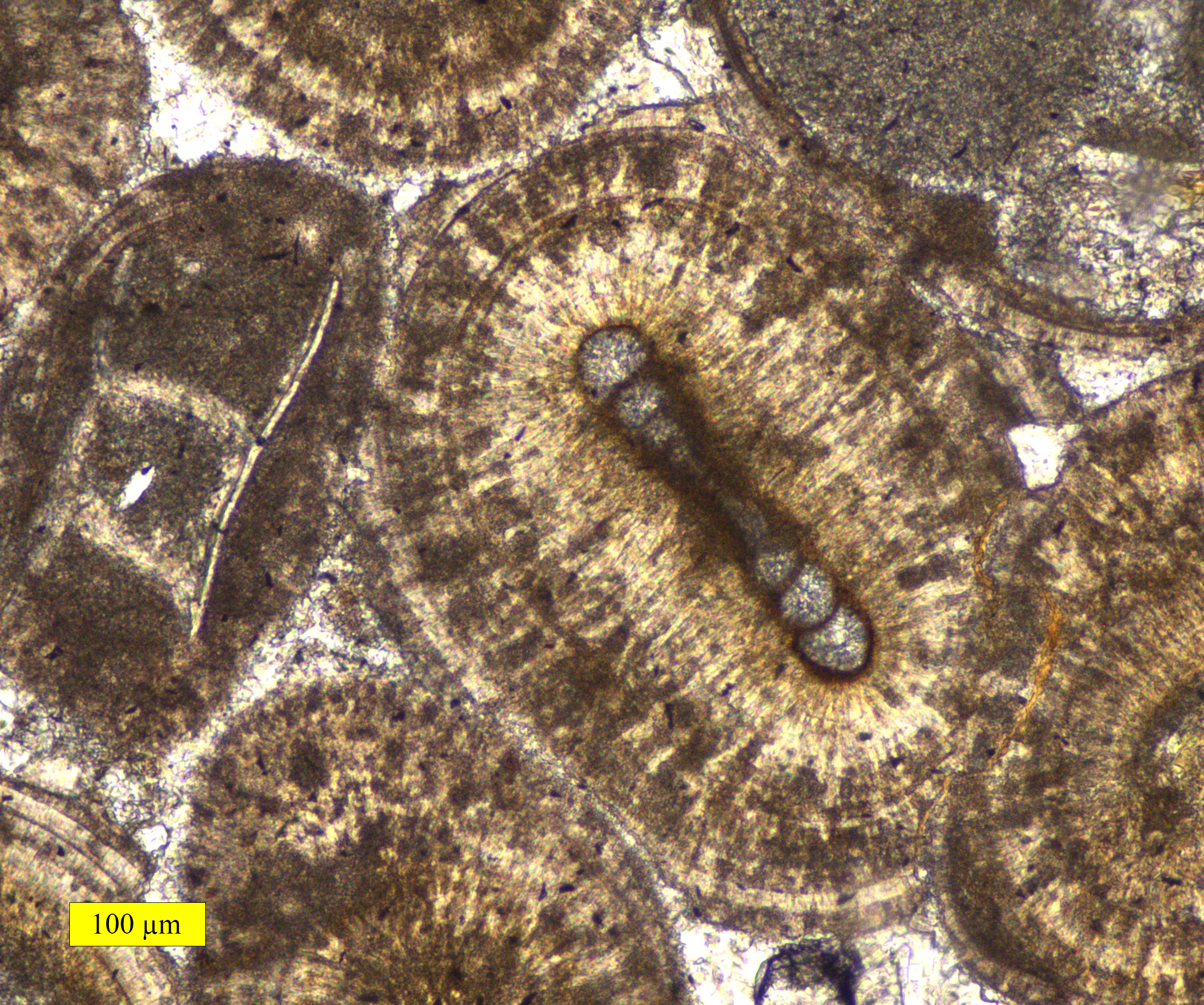
Fossils ooimmured in ooids from the Carmel Formation (Middle Jurassic of southern Utah).

== Ooimmuration ==
Sometimes fossils are included in ooids, often forming the nuclei. This taphonomic process is termed ooimmuration. The formation of the ooid cortex around the test or shell protects it from abrasion, fragmentation and bioerosion. Ooimmuration also retains fine organic remains that would ordinarily be winnowed away by currents.
