= List of fellows of the Royal Society elected in 1977 =

This is a list of fellows of the Royal Society elected in 1977.

== Fellows ==
1. Erich Armand Arthur Joseph Huckel (1896–1980)
2. Alfred Spinks (1917–1982)
3. Oliver Louis Zangwill (1913–1987)
4. Sir Richard Oswald Chandler Norman (1932–1993)
5. Frank Pasquill (1914–1994)
6. Richard Hume Adrian 2nd Baron Adrian of Cambridge (1927–1995)
7. William John Strang (1921–1999)
8. Gopalasamudram Narayana Ramachandran (1922–2001)
9. Vincent Massey (1926–2002)
10. John Maynard Smith (1920–2004)
11. Rendel Sebastian Pease (1922–2004)
12. Isabella Helen Mary Muir (1920–2005)
13. Sir Thomas Richard Edmund Southwood (1931–2005)
14. Alan Arthur Wells (d. 2005)
15. Setsuro Ebashi (1922–2006)
16. Edward Arthur Boyse (d. 2007)
17. Edward Granville Broadbent (d. 2008)
18. David Henry Cushing (d. 2008)
19. Jeremy Randall Knowles (d. 2008)
20. Izrael Moiseivich Gelfand (d. 2009)
21. Ephraim Katchalski-Katzir (d. 2009)
22. Alec Douglas Bangham (d. 2010)
23. John Philip Cooper (1923–2011)
24. Cyril Domb (1920–2012)
25. Peter Orlebar Bishop (d. 2012)
26. Peter Gray (d. 2012)
27. Bruce Bilby (1922–2013)
28. Donald Thomas Anderson
29. Sir Eric Albert Ash
30. John Bingham
31. Martin Harold Phillips Bott
32. Peter Chadwick
33. Alexander Lamb Cullen
34. Peter Duncumb
35. Ronald James Gillespie
36. Jeffrey Goldstone
37. Leon Mestel
38. Stephen Erwin Moorbath
39. John Raymond Postgate
40. John Robert Ringrose
41. Sir William Duncan Paterson Stewart
42. Sir John Meurig Thomas
43. Sir David John Weatherall
44. Sir Arnold Whittaker Wolfendale
