= Electron probe microanalysis =

Imaging technique for solid chemical analysis

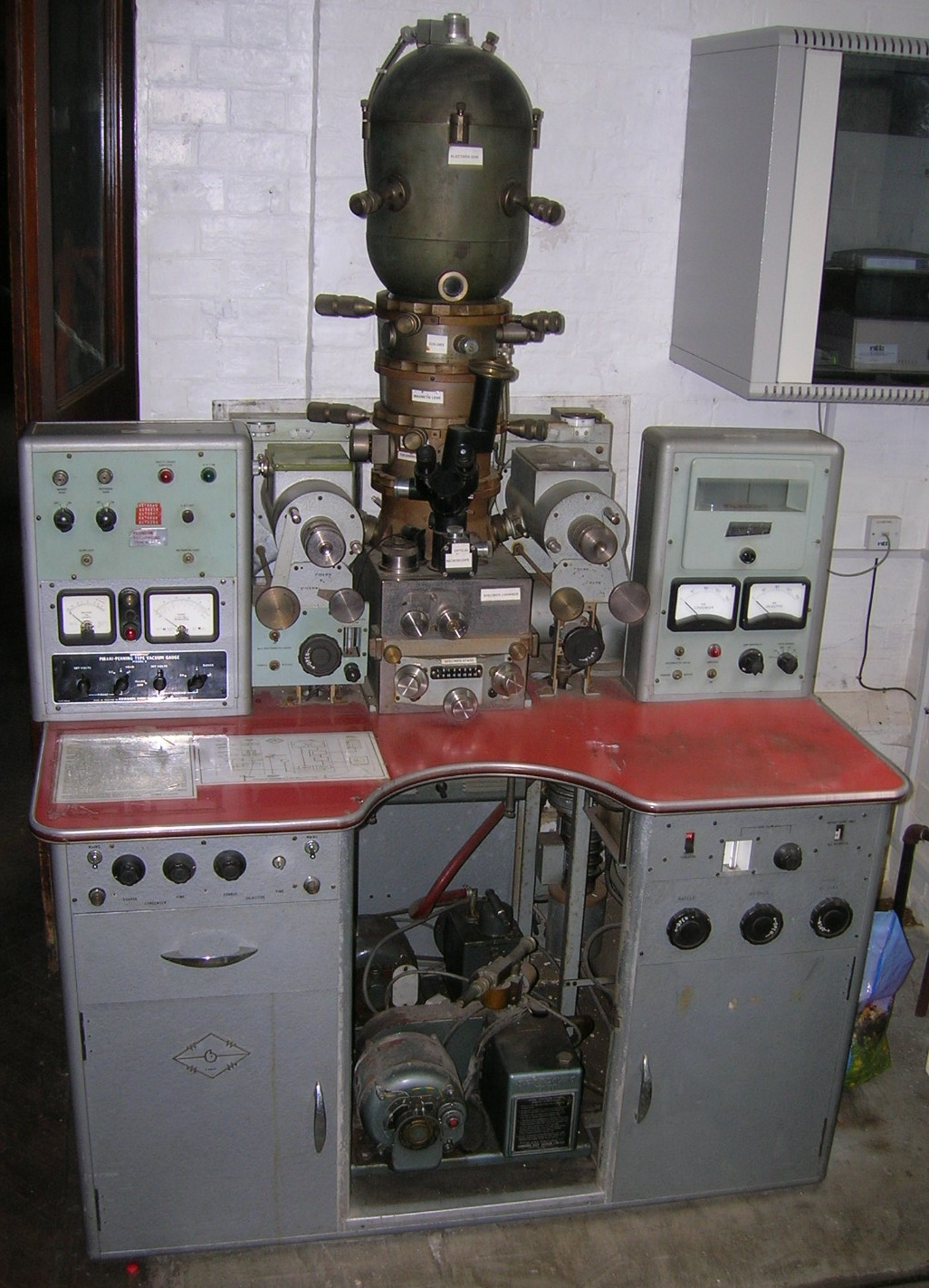
A Cambridge Scientific Instrument Company "Microscan" electron probe microanalyzer based on a design by Peter Duncumb and David Melford. This model is housed at the Cambridge Museum of Technology

Electron probe microanalysis (EPMA), also known as electron probe X-ray microanalysis, electron microprobe analysis (EMPA) or electron probe analysis (EPA) is a microanalytical and imaging technique used to non-destructively determine the chemical element composition of small volumes of solid materials. The device used for this technique is known as an electron probe microanalyzer (also abbreviated EPMA), often shortened to electron microprobe (EMP) or electron probe (EP).

In EPMA, the instrument bombards the sample with a high-intensity electron beam, which then emits X-rays. The X-ray wavelengths emitted are characteristic of particular chemical elements and are analyzed using X-ray spectroscopy. The same principle is also employed in wavelength- or energy-dispersive X-ray spectroscopy (WDX, EDX) commonly used in scanning electron microscopes (SEM), but EPMA is characterized by a fixed electron beam rather than a scanning one and primarily used for elemental analysis rather than imaging.

== Principles ==
An electron gun produces an electron beam focused on the sample through a series of magnetic lenses, much like a SEM. However, a key difference from a SEM is that the electron beam is fixed rather than raster scanning, which makes it incapable of producing scanning electron micrograph images. The electron beam has a significantly higher beam current than is typical of a SEM and is highly stabilized and focused using a special beam stabilization system. This allows the electrons to more deeply penetrate the sample, producing characteristic X-rays at a high signal-to-noise ratio.

The characteristic X-ray signal is typically analyzed by one or more wavelength-dispersive X-ray spectrometers (WDS), which use a pivoting-crystal goniometer to discern the angle relative to the crystal's surface at which the reflected X-ray's first-order diffraction peak is detected. Using this angle and the known distance between lattice planes of the reflecting crystal, Bragg's law can then be applied to derive the wavelength of the characteristic X-ray emitted from the sample, which is unique to a particular chemical element. An EPMA may also have a number of other detectors, such as an energy-dispersive X-ray spectrometer, detectors for secondary and backscattered electrons, or a detector for cathodoluminescence.

This enables the abundances of elements present within small sample volumes (typically 10-30 cubic micrometers or less) to be determined, when a conventional accelerating voltage of 15–20 kV is used. The concentrations of elements from lithium to plutonium may be measured at levels as low as 100 parts per million (ppm), material dependent, although with care, levels below 10 ppm are possible. The ability to quantify lithium by EPMA became a reality in 2008.

== History ==
The electron microprobe (electron probe microanalyzer) developed from two technologies: electron microscopy, which uses a focused high energy electron beam to impact a target material, and X-ray spectroscopy, which identifies the photons scattered from the electron beam impact, with the energy/wavelength of the photons characteristic of the atoms excited by the incident electrons. Ernst Ruska and Max Knoll are associated with the prototype electron microscope in 1931. Henry Moseley was involved in the discovery of the direct relationship between the wavelength of X-rays and the identity of the atom from which it originated.

Several historical threads combined in the early development of electron beam microanalysis. One was the work of James Hillier and Richard Baker at RCA. In the early 1940s, they built an electron microprobe, combining an electron microscope and an energy loss spectrometer. A patent application was filed in 1944. Electron energy loss spectroscopy is very good for light element analysis and they obtained spectra of C-Kα, N-Kα and O-Kα radiation. In 1947, Hiller patented the concept of using an electron beam to produce analytical X-rays, but never constructed a working model. His design proposed using Bragg diffraction from a flat crystal to select specific X-ray wavelengths and a photographic plate as a detector. However, RCA had no interest in commercializing this invention.

A second thread developed in France in the late 1940s. In 1948–1950, Raimond Castaing, supervised by André Guinier, built the first electron "microsonde électronique" (electron microprobe) at ONERA. This microprobe produced an electron beam diameter of 1-3 μm with a beam current of ~10 nanoamperes (nA) and used a Geiger counter to detect the X-rays produced from the sample. However, the Geiger counter could not distinguish X-rays produced from specific elements and in 1950, Castaing added a quartz crystal between the sample and the detector to permit wavelength discrimination. He also added an optical microscope to view the point of beam impact. The resulting microprobe was described in Castaing's 1951 PhD thesis, translated into English by Pol Duwez and David Wittry, in which he laid the foundations of the theory and application of quantitative analysis by electron microprobe, establishing the theoretical framework for the matrix corrections of absorption and fluorescence effects. Castaing is considered the father of electron microprobe analysis.

The 1950s was a decade of great interest in electron beam X-ray microanalysis, following Castaing's presentations at the First European Microscopy Conference in Delft in 1949 and then at the National Bureau of Standards conference on Electron Physics in Washington, DC, in 1951, as well as at other conferences in the early to mid-1950s. Many researchers, mainly material scientists, developed their own experimental electron microprobes, sometimes starting from scratch, but many times using surplus electron microscopes.

Concurrently, Pol Duwez, a Belgian material scientist who fled the Nazis and settled at the California Institute of Technology (Caltech) and collaborated with Jesse DuMond, encountered André Guinier on a train in Europe in 1952, where he learned of Castaing's new instrument and the suggestion that Caltech build a similar instrument. David Wittry was hired to build such an instrument as his PhD thesis, which he completed in 1957. It became the prototype for the ARL EMX electron microprobe.

During the late 1950s and early 1960s there were over a dozen other laboratories in North America, the United Kingdom, Europe, Japan and the USSR developing electron beam X-ray microanalyzers.

The first commercial electron microprobe, the "MS85" was produced by CAMECA (France) in 1956.. It was soon followed in the early-mid 1960s by microprobes from other companies; however, all companies except CAMECA, JEOL and Shimadzu Corporation went out of business. Significant subsequent improvements and modifications to microprobes included the addition of solid state EDS detectors (1968) and the development of synthetic multilayer diffracting crystals for analysis of light elements (1984). One breakthrough of particular note, however, was the development, from the late 1950's onwards, of scanning microprobes; that is, devices which could scan the electron beam across a sample to make X-ray maps. These found great application in metallurgy, see section below.

Later, CAMECA pioneered manufacturing a shielded electron microprobe for nuclear applications. Several advances in CAMECA instruments in recent decades expanded the range of applications in metallurgy, electronics, geology, mineralogy, nuclear plants, trace elements, and dentistry.

=== Application in metallurgy ===
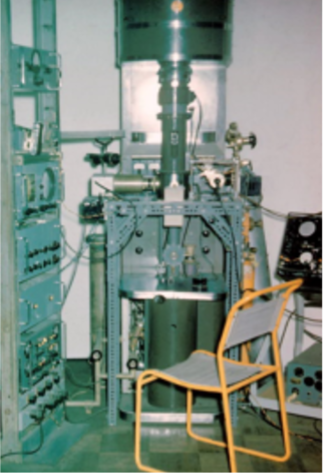
Duncumb's instrument in the Cavendish laboratory, Cambridge. 1957

At the end of the 1950's, Castaing's innovative work was complemented by an instrument that scanned the electron beam and thus enabled the distribution of trace and alloying elements in a sample of metal to be imaged. From a metallurgist's point of view this constituted the biggest advance in metallography since Henry Clifton Sorby had invented the reflected light microscope a hundred years earlier. For while it is helpful to be able to detect the presence of an element on the micron scale, it is even more valuable to be able to image its distribution. This ability to detect for the first time the presence of alloying or trace elements dissolved in a host metal, and image their distribution advanced the science of metallurgy itself. It enabled the identification of non-metallic inclusions, revealed segregation during solidification, and allowed identification of the sources of grain boundary weakness as well as many other problems. The instrument that first did this, the scanning electron probe microanalyzer, emerged from research at Cambridge University, and development work at the nearby laboratories of British engineering firm Tube Investments (TI). It is one of the early examples of a breakthrough borne of the close collaboration between university and industry in what became known as the Cambridge Phenomenon.

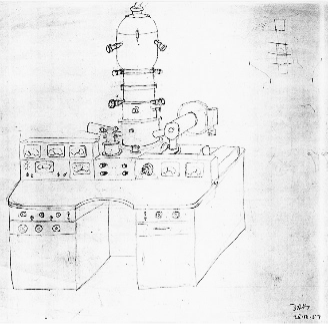
Melford's 'Christmas Day' sketch of general arrangement. 1957

One of the organizers of the 1949 Delft Electron Microscopy conference had been Vernon Ellis Cosslett at the Cavendish Laboratory at Cambridge University, a center of research on electron microscopy. Concurrently, in the Department of Engineering at Cambridge, Charles Oatley had been working on the related but distinct field scanning electron microscopy, and Bill Nixon on X-ray microscopy. In 1957 Peter Duncumb, then a young physicist and research fellow, combined all three technologies to produce a prototype scanning electron X-ray microanalyzer for his PhD thesis.

Meanwhile, ten miles south of Cambridge, British engineering group Tube Investments (TI) had recently opened (1954) a group research laboratory; the Tube Investments Research Laboratory (TIRL) at Hinxton Hall, and in 1957 had recruited David Melford, a metallurgist from Cambridge who had just completed his own PhD. They set him the task of finding the distribution of trace elements dissolved in steel in regions on the scale of microns. Melford was quickly directed to Duncumb, back at the university, and on August 7, 1957, the pair examined a piece of steel in the instrument Duncumb had built. It proved an ideal demonstration of the potential value of this equipment as a research tool.

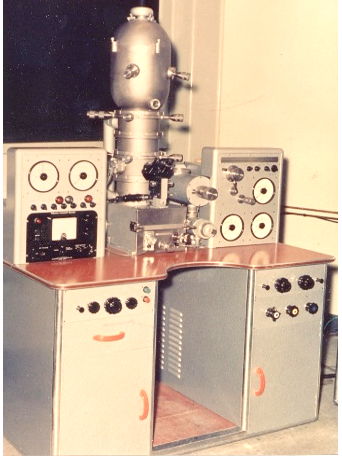
The Hinxton Instrument, the world's first scanning electron microprobe for metallurgical use, 1958. Now in the reserve collection of the Science Museum in London.

TIRL at once recruited Duncumb as a consultant and tasked Melford to design whatever it took to embody the demonstrator Duncumb had developed into an instrument for metallurgical use. Melford's pencil sketch, drawn on Christmas Day 1957 and now in the Cambridge University library, defined the layout of the instrument, although no engineering drawings had yet been made. Crucially, the instrument included an optical metallurgical microscope, essential in selection of the field of view, and allowing both optical and X-ray images of the sample to be captured and studied alongside each other. Duncumb and he then produced around a 100 dimensioned sketches which the well-equipped workshop at Hinxton Hall converted into a finished instrument. It was commissioned shortly before Christmas 1958 and is now in the reserve collection of the Science Museum, London.

There had been no thought so far of building anything other than a valuable research tool, but, in January 1959, H. C. Pritchard the Managing Director of the Cambridge Instrument Company visited TIRL and saw the instrument in action. In March of that year the Company, with the agreement of TI and the Cavendish Laboratory, decided to build a copy – the first commercial scanning electron probe microanalyzer. With the help of Duncumb and Melford's drawings, they soon started manufacture and the first instrument was on show at the Institute of Physics meeting in January 1960. This early example (pictured at the head of this page) is now in the Cambridge Museum of Technology.

== Operation ==
A beam of electrons is fired at a sample. The beam causes each element in the sample to emit X-rays at a characteristic frequency; the X-rays can then be detected by the electron microprobe. The size and current density of the electron beam determines the trade-off between resolution and scan time and/or analysis time.

=== Detailed description ===
Low-energy electrons are produced from a tungsten filament, a lanthanum hexaboride crystal cathode or a field emission electron source and accelerated by a positively biased anode plate to 3 to 30 thousand electron volts (keV). The anode plate has central aperture and electrons that pass through it are collimated and focused by a series of magnetic lenses and apertures. The resulting electron beam (approximately 5 nm to 10 μm diameter) may be rastered across the sample or used in spot mode to produce excitation of various effects in the sample. Among these effects are: phonon excitation (heat), cathodoluminescence (visible light fluorescence), continuum X-ray radiation (bremsstrahlung), characteristic X-ray radiation, secondary electrons (plasmon production), backscattered electron production, and Auger electron production.

When the beam electrons (and scattered electrons from the sample) interact with bound electrons in the innermost electron shells of the atoms of the various elements in the sample, they can scatter the bound electrons from the electron shell producing a vacancy in that shell (ionization of the atom). This vacancy is unstable and must be filled by an electron from either a higher energy bound shell in the atom (producing another vacancy which is in turn filled by electrons from yet higher energy bound shells) or by unbound electrons of low energy. The difference in binding energy between the electron shell in which the vacancy was produced and the shell from which the electron comes to fill the vacancy is emitted as a photon. The energy of the photon is in the X-ray region of the electromagnetic spectrum. As the electron structure of each element is unique, the series X-ray line energies produced by vacancies in the innermost shells is characteristic of that element, although lines from different elements may overlap. As the innermost shells are involved, the X-ray line energies are generally not affected by chemical effects produced by bonding between elements in compounds except in low atomic number (Z) elements (B, C, N, O and F for K_{alpha} and Al to Cl for K_{beta}) where line energies may be shifted as a result of the involvement of the electron shell from which vacancies are filled in chemical bonding.

The characteristic X-rays are used for chemical analysis. Specific X-ray wavelengths or energies are selected and counted, either by wavelength-dispersive X-ray spectroscopy (WDS) or energy-dispersive X-ray spectroscopy (EDS). WDS utilizes Bragg diffraction from crystals to select X-ray wavelengths of interest and direct them to gas-flow or sealed proportional detectors. In contrast, EDS uses a solid state semiconductor detector to accumulate X-rays of all wavelengths produced from the sample. While EDS yields more information and typically requires a much shorter counting time, WDS is generally more precise with lower limits of detection due to its superior X-ray peak resolution and greater peak to background ratio.

Element composition is determined by comparing the intensities of characteristic X-rays from the sample with intensities from standards of known composition. Counts from the sample must be corrected for matrix effects (depth of production of the X-rays, absorption and secondary fluorescence) to yield quantitative elemental compositions. The resulting chemical data is gathered in textural context. Variations in chemical composition within a material (zoning), such as a mineral grain or metal, can be readily determined.

The interaction volume from which chemical information is gathered (volume of X-rays generated) is 0.3–3 cubic micrometers.

=== Limitations ===
- WDS cannot determine elements below number 5 (boron). This restricts WDS when analyzing geologically important elements such as H, Li, and Be.
- Despite the improved spectral resolution of elemental peaks, some peaks exhibit significant overlap that causes analytical challenges (e.g., VKα and TiKβ). WDS analyses are unable to distinguish the valence states of elements (e.g. Fe^{2+} vs. Fe^{3+}) which must be obtained by other techniques such as Mössbauer spectroscopy or electron energy loss spectroscopy.
- Element isotopes cannot be determined by WDS, and are most commonly determined with a mass spectrometer.

== Applications ==
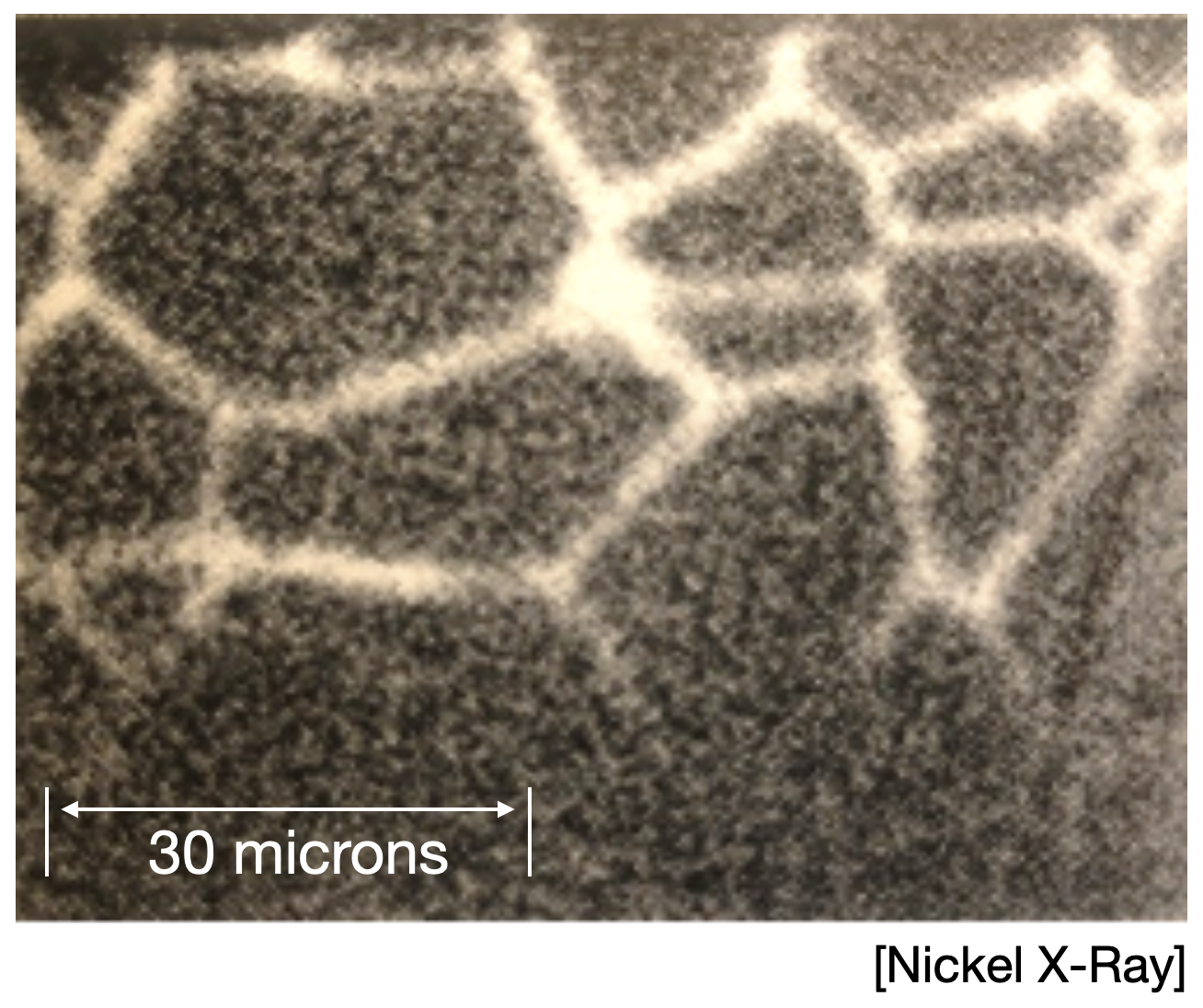
Sample of 0.23% nickel steel imaged by a Scanning Electron Microanalyser, showing raised concentrations of nickel along grain boundaries

=== Materials science and engineering ===
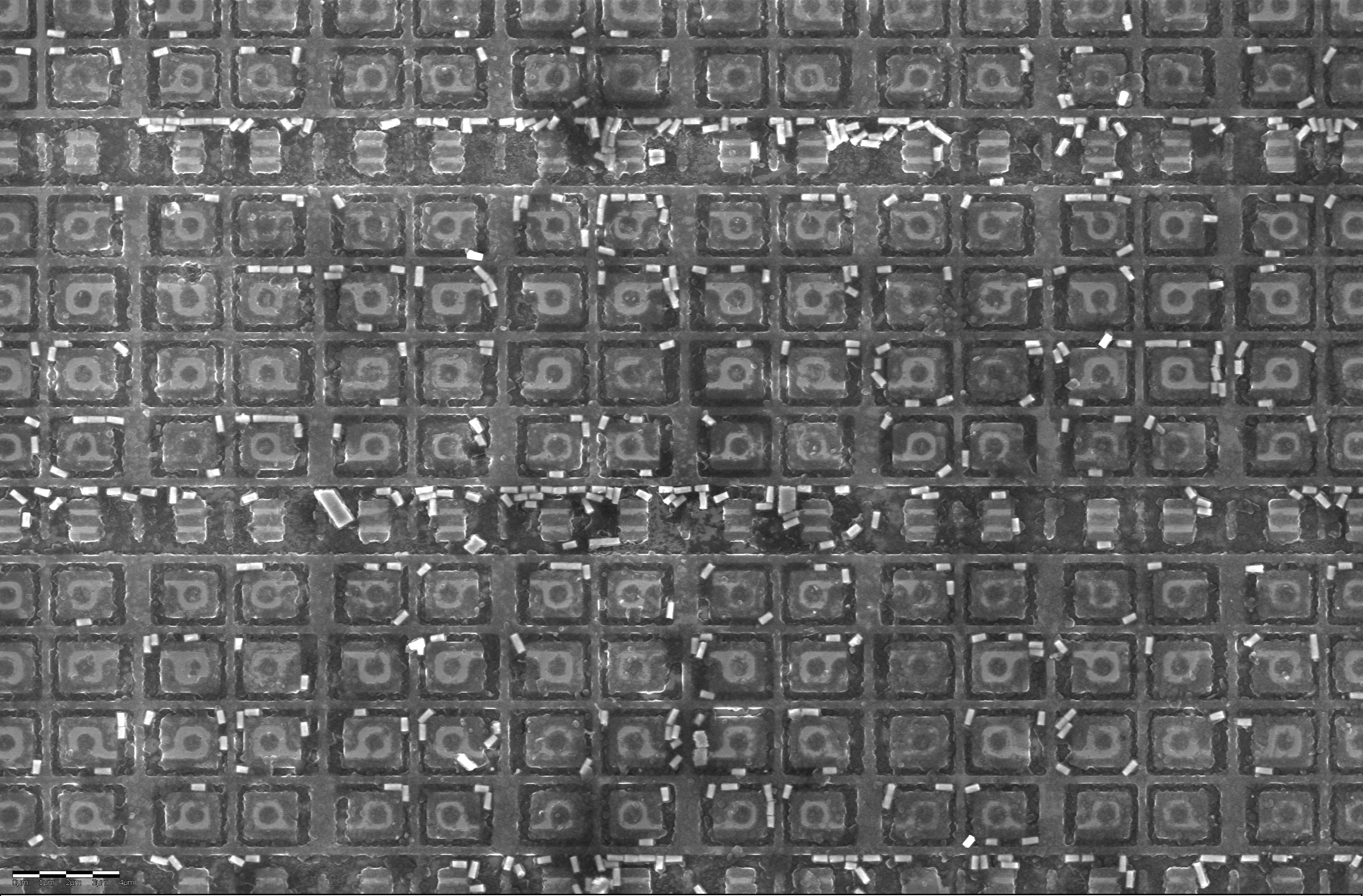
A section of the 1886VE10 microcontroller die by an electron microprobe. The small bright cylinders are tungsten vias left over from metalization etching. X-ray spectroscopy can be used to determine the composition of the vias.

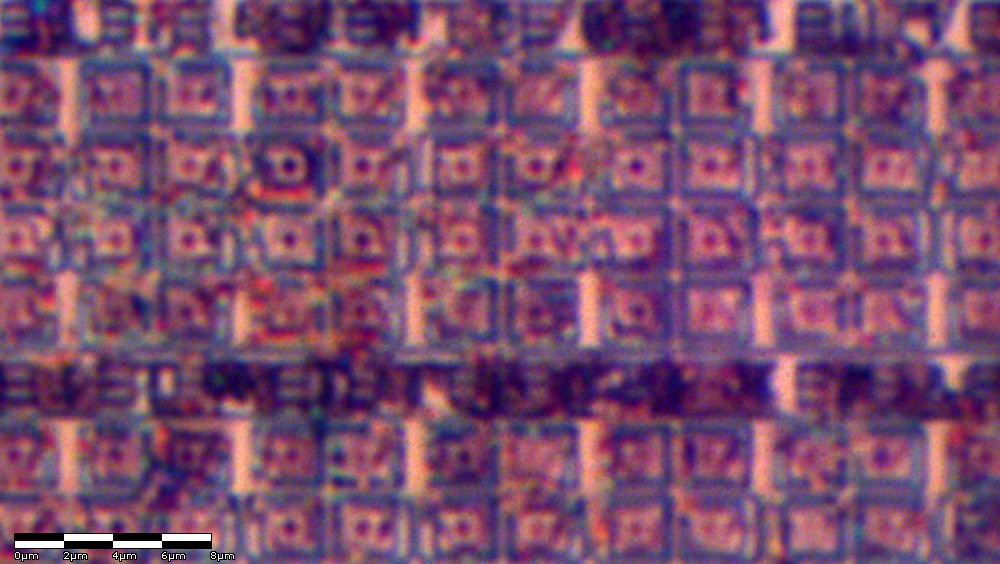
For comparison, a similar section of the same microcontroller die by an optical microscope

The technique is commonly used for analyzing the chemical composition of metals, alloys, ceramics, and glasses. It is particularly useful for assessing the composition of individual particles or grains and chemical changes on the scale of a few micrometres to millimeters. The photograph to the right is an output image from an early scanning electron microanalyzer of a sample of steel containing nickel at 0.23%. The lighter regions, at the grain boundaries between iron crystals, are actually created in this image by the raised concentrations of Nickel, which had concentrated at the surface of the sample during oxidation at a high temperature, and then diffused down the boundaries between the iron crystals into the steel. This concentration in the boundaries was measured by the electron microprobe at 3–4%.

The electron microprobe is widely used for research, quality control, and failure analysis.

=== Mineralogy and petrology ===
This technique is most commonly used by mineralogists and petrologists. Most rocks are aggregates of small mineral grains. These grains may preserve chemical information acquired during their formation and subsequent alteration. This information may illuminate geologic processes such as crystallization, lithification, volcanism, metamorphism, orogenic events (mountain building), and plate tectonics. This technique is also used for the study of extraterrestrial rocks (meteorites), and provides chemical data which is vital to understanding the evolution of the planets, asteroids, and comets.

The change in elemental composition from the center (also known as core) to the edge (or rim) of a mineral can yield information about the history of the crystal's formation, including the temperature, pressure, and chemistry of the surrounding medium. Quartz crystals, for example, incorporate a small, but measurable amount of titanium into their structure as a function of temperature, pressure, and the amount of titanium available in their environment. Changes in these parameters are recorded by titanium as the crystal grows.

=== Paleontology ===
In exceptionally preserved fossils, such as those of the Burgess Shale, soft parts of organisms may be preserved. Since these fossils are often compressed into a planar film, it can be difficult to distinguish the features: a famous example is the triangular extensions in Opabinia, which were interpreted as either legs or extensions of the gut. Elemental mapping showed that their composition was similar to the gut, favoring that interpretation. Because of the thinness of carbon films, only low voltages (5-15 kV) can be used on them.

=== Meteorite analysis ===
The chemical composition of meteorites can be analyzed quite accurately using EPMA. This can reveal much about the conditions that existed in the early Solar System.

== See also ==
- Electron microscope
- Electron spectroscopy
- Thin section
