= Peter Duncumb =

British physicist

Peter Duncumb FRS FInstP
- Born: 26 January 1931 (age 95)
- Education: University of Cambridge
- Awards: Charles Vernon Boys Prize (1966); FRS (1977); Henry Clifton Sorby Award (1996)
- Scientific career
- Fields: X-ray microscopy; microanalysis
- Workplaces: University of Cambridge; TI Group
- Doctoral advisor: Vernon Ellis Cosslett

Peter Duncumb FRS FInstP (born 26 January 1931) is a British physicist specialising in X-ray microscopy and microanalysis. He is best known for his contribution to the development of the first electron microprobe.

== Early life and education ==
Duncumb was educated at Clare College, Cambridge. He earned his PhD in 1957, under the supervision of Vernon Ellis Cosslett.

== Career ==
Duncumb worked at the University of Cambridge as a research fellow from 1957 until 1959. He carried out key work on the development of the scanning electron probe X-ray microanalyser, now a common tool for surface studies in most materials laboratories. His early work led to the first commercial instrument for imaging the distribution of selected chemical elements on a microscale, providing essential information for failure analysis and the development of new materials.

After joining the Central Laboratories of Tube Investments in 1959, he built a second instrument, known as EMMA, combining X-ray microanalysis with transmission electron microscopy. This made possible a finer analysis of thin film and particulate samples, and led again to commercial production. Later, he took on broader management responsibilities, retiring in 1987 after 8 years as Laboratory Director.

Since 1988, he has been working as a consultant on the interpretation of X-ray spectra, and on the use of phased arrays in ultrasonic testing. He also served as chairman of the Royal Society's Paul Instrument Fund. He is an honorary member of both the US and European microbeam analysis societies.

== Awards and honours ==
In 1966, Duncumb won the Charles Vernon Boys Prize (now known as the Moseley Medal) of the Institute of Physics for "the design and construction of the scanning electron probe system for localized elemental analysis". He was elected a Fellow of the Royal Society (FRS) in 1977. In 1996, he received the Henry Clifton Sorby Award of the International Metallographic Society.

The Peter Duncumb Award for Excellence in Microanalysis, awarded yearly by the Microanalysis Society since 2007, is named in his honour.
