= Microanalysis =

Microanalysis is the chemical identification and quantitative analysis of very small amounts of chemical substances (generally less than 10 mg or 1 ml) or very small surfaces of material (generally less than 1 cm^{2}). One of the pioneers in the microanalysis of chemical elements was the Slovenian-Austrian Nobel Prize winner Fritz Pregl.

== Methods ==
The most known methods used in microanalysis include:

- Most of the spectroscopy methods: ultraviolet–visible spectroscopy, infrared spectroscopy, nuclear magnetic resonance, X-ray fluorescence, Energy-dispersive X-ray spectroscopy, Wavelength-dispersive X-ray spectroscopy, and mass spectrometry
- Most of the chromatography methods : high-performance liquid chromatography, Gel permeation chromatography;
- Some thermal analysis methods: differential scanning calorimetry, thermogravimetric analysis;
- Electrophoresis;
- Field flow fractionation;
- X-ray diffraction;
- Combustion analysis.

== Advantages ==
Compared to normal analyses methods, microanalysis:

- Can resolve fine-scale variations in chemical elements.
- Can be used to identify the presence and distribution of different phases in materials.
- Requires less sample material and therefore can provide information on microscopic objects.

== Disadvantages ==
- Handling of small quantities is not always simple.
- Higher accuracy of weighing is necessary (e.g. use of accurate balance).
- Sample surface preparation can have a major impact on measurement results.
