= Faraday House =

Former electrical engineering college in London

Coordinates: 51.519483°N 0.12155°W

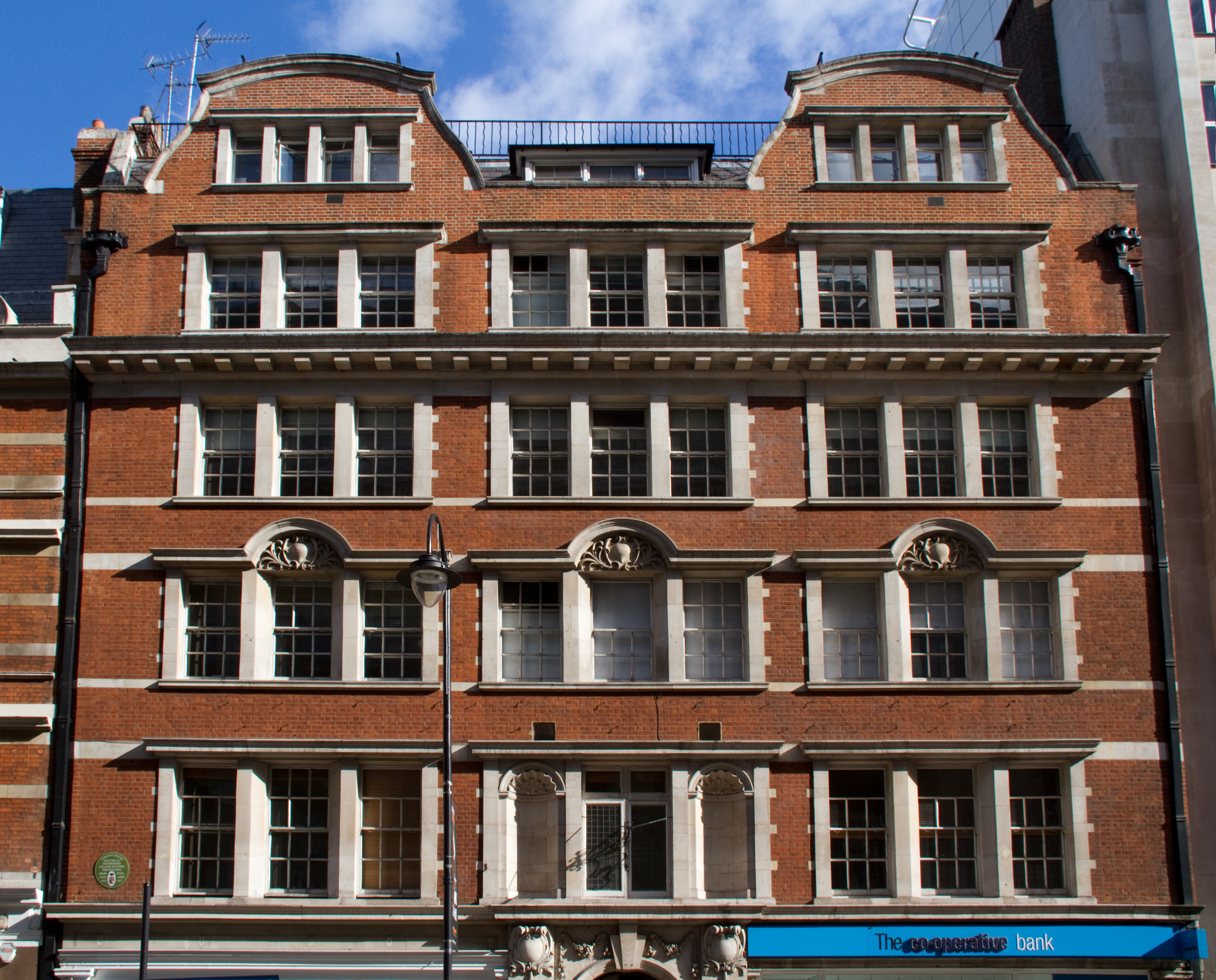
Faraday House

Faraday House Electrical Engineering College was created to train engineers in power generation and distribution. It was set up at a time before engineering was widely taught at universities, founded as an adjunct to a commercial company for supplying towns with electricity. It operated between 1889 and 1967, mainly at Southampton Row, London. Six of its alumni have been presidents of the Institution of Electrical Engineers.

The Faraday House curriculum covered the whole electrical field, at a level less theoretical than the City and Guilds Institute at South Kensington, with the four-year course of study resulting in a D.F.H. (Diploma of Faraday House). The first year was spent at the college, then eight months at a mechanical engineering works, followed by five more terms at the college, and finally a period spent as a graduate apprentice at an electrical engineering works. Examinations were supervised by the Institution of Electrical Engineers, and two senior scholarships were offered; the Faraday (75 guineas per annum), and the Maxwell (40 guineas per annum).

At a 1992 symposium held in his honour, the microscopist Vernon Ellis Cosslett, who lectured at the college from 1935 to 1939, during an interview with Tom Mulvey, of the Department of Electronic Engineering and Applied Physics at Aston University, Birmingham, related: "... Faraday House... an 'Engineering College for the sons of Gentlemen'... was set up in the 1880s before electrical engineering was respectable at universities; the engineering industry set it up on their own account and funded it themselves. They had a grand man in charge, one Alexander Robinson, a man of some eminence... running the thing very well at a level we would now call HNC, Higher National Certificate, Higher National Diploma level."

The building has been occupied by Syracuse University's study abroad program since 2005.
