= John Philip Cooper =

Australian botanist (1923–2011)

John Cooper CBE FRS
- Born: John Philip Cooper; 16 December 1923
- Died: 18 November 2011 (aged 87)
- Education: Stockport Grammar School
- Alma mater: University of Reading (BSc 1945, PhD 1953, DSc 1964)
- Scientific career
- Fields: Agricultural botany Photosynthetic efficiency
- Institutions: University of Wales

John Philip Cooper CBE FRS (1923–2011) was a Professor of Agricultural Botany at the University of Wales. He was elected a Fellow of the Royal Society (FRS) in 1977, and appointed CBE in the 1983 Birthday Honours.
