= Oolite =

Sedimentary rock formed from ooids

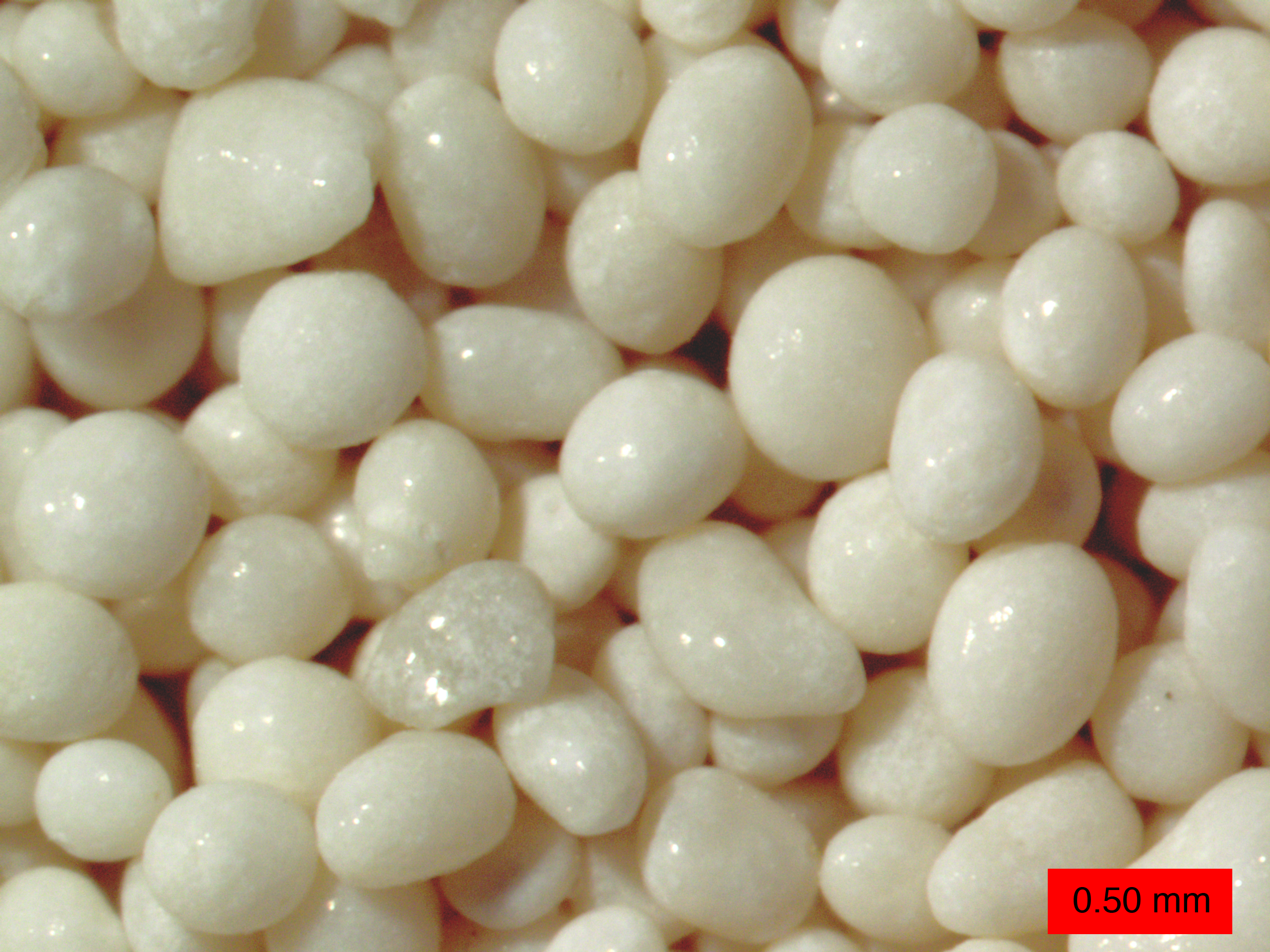
Modern ooids from a beach on Joulter Cays, The Bahamas, with 0.5 mm scale

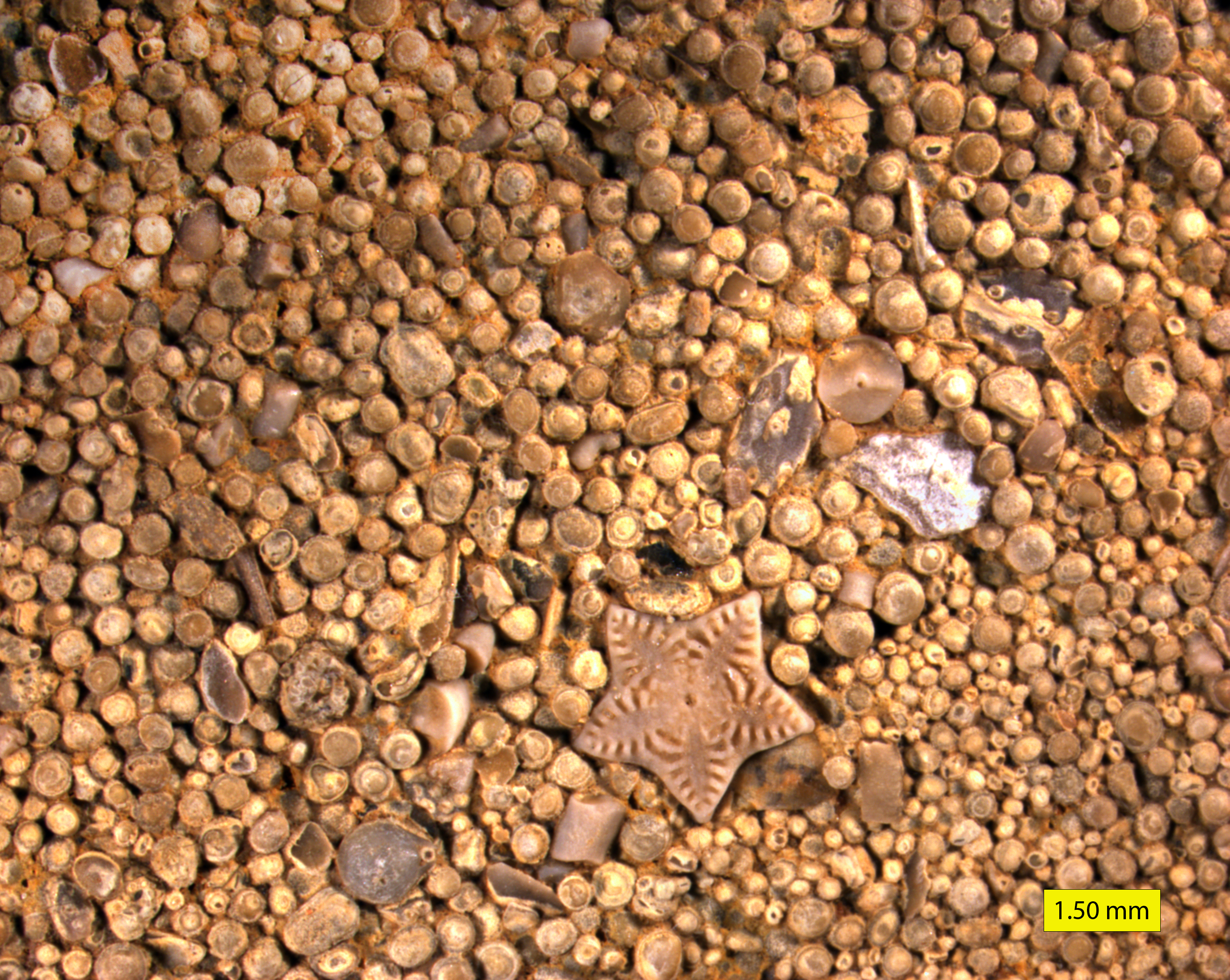
Ooids on the surface of a limestone; Carmel Formation (Middle Jurassic) of southern Utah

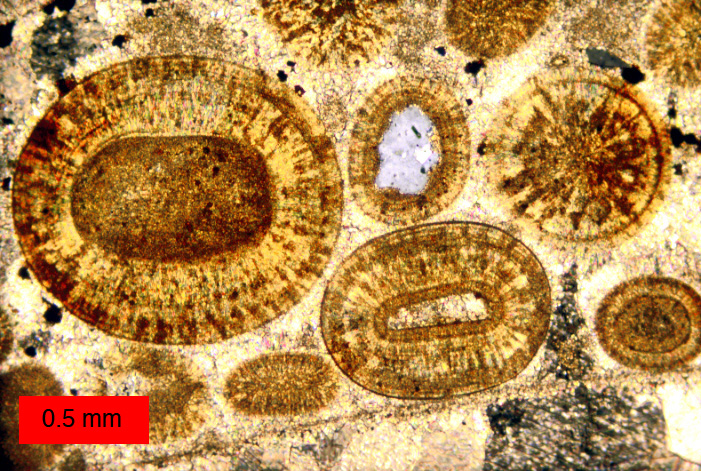
Thin-section of calcitic ooids from an oolite within the Carmel Formation (Middle Jurassic) of southern Utah

Oolite or oölite (from Ancient Greek ᾠόν (ōión) 'egg stone') is a sedimentary rock formed from ooids, spherical grains composed of concentric layers. Strictly, oolites consist of ooids of diameter 0.25–2 millimetres; rocks composed of ooids larger than 2 mm are called pisolites. The term oolith can refer to oolite or individual ooids.

== Composition ==
Ooids are most commonly composed of calcium carbonate (calcite or aragonite), but can be composed of phosphate, clays, chert, dolomite, or iron minerals, including hematite. Dolomitic and chert ooids are most likely the result of the replacement of the original texture in limestone. Oolitic hematite occurs at Red Mountain near Birmingham, Alabama, along with oolitic limestone.

They are usually formed in warm, supersaturated, shallow, highly agitated marine intertidal environments, though some are formed in inland lakes. The mechanism of formation starts with a small fragment of sediment acting as a seed, such as a piece of a shell. Strong intertidal currents wash the seeds around on the seabed, where they accumulate layers of chemically precipitated calcite from the supersaturated water. Oolites are commonly found in large current-bedding structures that resemble sand dunes. The size of the oolites reflect the time that they were exposed to the water before they were covered with later sediment.

Oolites are often used in the home-aquarium industry because their small grain size (0.2 to 1.22 mm) is ideal for shallow static beds and bottom covering of up to 1" in depth. Also known as oolitic sand, the sugar-sized round grains of this sand pass easily through the gills of gobies and other sand-sifting organisms. This unusually smooth sand promotes the growth of bacteria, which are important biofilters in home aquaria. Because of its extremely small grain size, oolitic sand has a lot of surface area, which promotes high bacterial growth.

== Occurrence ==
Some exemplar oolitic limestone was formed in England during the Jurassic period, and forms the Cotswold Hills, the Isle of Portland with its famous Portland Stone, the Osmington Oolite, and part of the North York Moors. A particular type, Bath Stone, gives the buildings of the World Heritage City of Bath their distinctive appearance. Carboniferous Hunts Bay Oolite lies under much of south Wales.

The Miami Rock Ridge of southeastern Florida, the islands of the Lower Florida Keys, and much of the Everglades are underlain by Miami Oolite. This limestone was formed by deposition when shallow seas covered the area between periods of glaciation. The material consolidated and eroded during later exposure above the ocean surface.

One of the world's largest freshwater lakebed oolites is the Shoofly Oolite, a section of the Glenns Ferry Formation on southwestern Idaho's Snake River Plain. 10 million years ago, the Plain formed the bed of Lake Idaho. Wave action in the lake washed sediments back and forth in the shallows on the southwestern shore, forming ooids and depositing them on steeper benches near the shore in 2–40-foot (0.61–12.19-metre) thicknesses. When the lake drained (2 to 4 million years ago), the oolite was left behind, along with siltstone, volcanic tuffs, and alluvium from adjacent mountain slopes. The other sediments eroded away, while the more resistant oolite weathered into hummocks, small arches, and other natural "sculptures". The Shoofly Oolite lies on public land west of Bruneau, Idaho, managed by the Bureau of Land Management (BLM). The physical and chemical properties of the Shoofly Oolite are the setting for a suite of rare plants, which the BLM protects through land use management and on-site interpretation.

This type of limestone is also found in Indiana in the United States. The town of Oolitic, Indiana, was founded for the trade in limestone and bears its name. Quarries in Oolitic, Bedford, and Bloomington contributed the materials for such US landmarks as the Empire State Building in New York and the Pentagon in Arlington, Virginia. Many of the buildings on the Indiana University campus in Bloomington are built with native oolitic limestone material, and the Soldiers' and Sailors' Monument in downtown Indianapolis, Indiana, is built mainly of grey oolitic limestone.

Oolites also appear in the Conococheague limestone, of Cambrian age, in the Great Appalachian Valley in Pennsylvania, Maryland, West Virginia, and Virginia.

Rogenstein is a term describing a specific type of oolite in which the cementing matter is argillaceous.

== See also ==
- Geologic time scale – System that relates geologic strata to time
- Pearl – Hard object produced within a living shelled mollusc – also formed from concentric layers of calcium carbonate
- Oolitic aragonite sand – Sand composed of an egg-like form of aragonite
