= Vernon Ellis Cosslett =

British physicist

Vernon Ellis Cosslett FRS
- Born: 16 June 1908; Cirencester, England, UK
- Died: 21 November 1990 (aged 82)
- Education: University of Bristol
- Awards: Duddell Medal (1971); FRS (1972); Royal Medal (1979)
- Scientific career
- Fields: Electron microscopy X-ray microscopy
- Institutions: Birkbeck College, London; University of Oxford; University of Cambridge
- Notable students: Peter Duncumb; Ray Dolby; Peter A. Sturrock

Vernon Ellis Cosslett, FRS (16 June 1908 – 21 November 1990) was a British microscopist.

The eighth child (of six sons and five daughters) of Edgar William Cosslett (1871–1948), a Welsh cabinet maker and carpenter, clerk of works on the estate of the Earl of Eldon at Stowell Park and latterly a builder, and Anne (née Williams; 1871–1951), he was raised at Cirencester and educated at Cirencester Grammar School, the University of Bristol, the Kaiser-Wilhelm-Institut, Berlin-Dahlem, and University College, London. He was a research fellow at the University of Bristol after completing his PhD there in 1932, having been awarded an H. H. Wills Memorial Fellowship, remaining there until 1935. He then lectured at Faraday House Engineering College, London, until 1939, whilst undertaking part-time research at Birkbeck College, London. Between 1939 and 1941 he was Keddey-Fletcher-Warr Research Fellow of London University, working at the University of Oxford as a temporary lecturer, then lecturing in physics at the University of Oxford Electrical Laboratory from 1941 to 1946.

From 1947, as an ICI Research Fellow, Cosslett worked with William Lawrence Bragg at the Cavendish Laboratory, Cambridge University on the electron microscope and founded the Electron Microscopy Department. He also developed improved x-ray machines.

== Honors and awards ==
Cosslett was elected Fellow of the Royal Society in 1972 and won the Royal Medal in 1979 "In recognition of his outstanding contributions to the design and development of the X-ray microscope, the scanning electron microprobe analyser, the high voltage and ultrahigh resolution (2.5A) electron microscopes and their applications in many disciplines."

He was elected president of the Royal Microscopical Society and was also instrumental in the creation of International Federation of Societies for Electron Microscopy where he was president from 1970 till 1973.

Cosslett won the Royal Medal in 1979 "In recognition of his outstanding contributions to the design and development of the X-ray microscope, the scanning electron microprobe analyzer, high voltage and ultrahigh resolution electron microscopes (2.5A) and their applications in many disciplines."

== Personal life ==
Cosslett had married firstly, in 1936, Rosemary Wilson. During the Second World War, Cosslett provided accommodation for refugee scientists at his flat in Hampstead; thus he met Viennese physicist and microscopist Dr Anna Joanna Wischin (1912–1969) whom Cosslett married in 1940 following his divorce from his first wife. Dr Anna Cosslett also worked at the Cavendish Laboratory. He had a son and a daughter from his second marriage.
