= QEMSCAN =

- QEMSCAN Automated Mineralogy system
- Type: Scanning electron microscope with proprietary hardware and software control
- Inventor: CSIRO
- Inception: 2001
- Manufacturer: FEI
- Available: yes
- Current supplier: FEI Australia Center of Excellence for Natural Resources
- Last production year: 2013
- Website: http://www.fei.com/applications/industry

QEMSCAN is the name for an integrated automated mineralogy and petrography system providing quantitative analysis of minerals, rocks and man-made materials. QEMSCAN is an abbreviation standing for quantitative evaluation of materials by scanning electron microscopy, and a registered trademark owned by FEI Company since 2009. Prior to 2009, QEMSCAN was developed, marketed and sold by Intellection Pty Ltd (a company owned by CSIRO) and also marketed and sold by LEO (Leica electron optics, a company jointly owned by Leica and Zeiss). The integrated system comprises a scanning electron microscope (SEM) with a large specimen chamber, up to four light-element energy-dispersive X-ray spectroscopy (EDS) detectors, an electron backscatter detector, and proprietary software and hardware controlling automated data acquisition. The offline software package iDiscover provides data processing and reporting functionality.

== Mineral identification and quantification ==
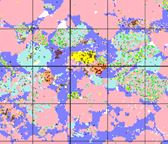
QEMSCAN image of a fluvial sandstone, grid size=500 μm

QEMSCAN creates phase assemblage maps of a specimen surface scanned by a high-energy accelerated electron beam along a predefined raster scan pattern. Low-count energy-dispersive X-ray spectra (EDX) are generated and provide information on the elemental composition at each measurement point. The elemental composition in combination with back-scattered electron (BSE) brightness and x-ray count rate information is converted into mineral phases. QEMSCAN data includes bulk mineralogy and calculated chemical assays. By mapping the sample surface, textural properties and contextual information such as particle and mineral grain size and shape, mineral associations, mineral liberation, elemental deportment, porosity, and matrix density can be calculated, visualized, and reported numerically. Data processing capabilities include combining multiple phases into mineral groups, resolving mixed spectra (boundary phase processing), image-based filtering, and particle-based classification. Quantitative reports can be generated for any selected number of samples, individual particles, and for particle classes sharing similar compositional and/or textural attributes, such as size fractions or rock types.

== Sample types and preparation ==
QEMSCAN is routinely employed in the analysis of rock- and ore-forming minerals. Sample preparation requirements include a level, dry specimen surface, coated with a thin electrically conductive layer (e.g. carbon). The sample must be stable under high vacuum conditions and the electron beam, typically 15 to 25 kV. Common sample types include 30 mm resin-impregnated blocks of drill cuttings and ore, thin sections of drill core and rocks, as well as soil samples. Very small particles such as atmospheric dust have been measured on carbon tape or filter paper. Coal samples are generally mounted in carnauba wax, providing sufficient contrast to allow for separation of the sample from the mounting medium, and subsequent measurement of coal and macerals.

== Software suite ==
QEMSCAN consists of proprietary software package iDiscover which consists of four software modules:

1. Datastore Explorer - data management module
2. iMeasure - measurement module, SEM and EDS control
3. iExplorer - data processing and classification tools, mineral database management, reports
4. SIP editor - phase identification protocol

== Measurement modes ==
QEMSCAN consists of five customisable measurement modes:

1. BMA bulk mineralogical analysis
2. PMA particle mineralogical analysis
3. SMS specific mineral search
4. TMS trace mineral search
5. Field Image surface imaging mode

== Applications ==
QEMSCAN measurements can be applied in quantitative mineral characterisation of rocks, weathering products such as regolith and soils, and most man-made materials. As a result, it has commercial and scientific applications in mining and mineral processing; O&G; coal; environmental sciences;, forensic geosciences; archaeology; agribusiness; built environment and planetary geology.

== History ==
- 1970s CSIRO Australia devised a way to automatically use Energy-dispersive X-ray spectroscopy technology and a scanning electron microscope to accurately image and identify minerals in ore samples. This technology became patented and known as QEM*SEM (quantitative evaluation of minerals by scanning electron microscopy)
- 1980s New digital hardware and software developments by CSIRO allowed for automated analysis of multiple samples, creation of particle images form which mineralogy, texture and metallurgical parameters can be extracted and quantified.
- 1990s Light element X-ray detectors are introduced improving the mineral identification.
- 2001 CSIRO announces intention to commercialise QEMSCAN.
- 2003 Intellection Pty Ltd. is founded to develop, market and sell QEMSCAN systems based on the ZEISS EVO scanning electron microscope.
- 2009 FEI Company announces the acquisition of selected assets from Intellection Pty Ltd., including the QEMSCAN technology.
- 2010, June. Ammtec completes the first "on site" analysis, utilising an "R" series QEMSCAN, at an oil well drilling site in Sumatra, RI.
- Sep.1, 2010 press release on version 5.0 iDiscover software including a new spectral analysis system capable of identifying 72 elements for improved complex mineral composition discrimination.
- Oct. 19, 2011 press release on introduction of QEMSCAN WellSite analysis solution, field-tested on onshore and offshore oil platforms in collaboration with mudlogging service providers and oil & gas companies, including Halliburton, Oil Search and Maersk.
- 2015 Development of QEMSCAN ceases.
