= Karl Milford =

Austrian economist (born 1950)

- Born: 1950 (age 75–76)
- Citizenship: Austrian
- Education: PhD
- Alma mater: University of Vienna
- Occupation: economist
- Employer(s): Faculty of Economics, University of Vienna
- Title: Ao. Univ.-Prof. i. R. Mag. Dr.

Karl Milford (born 1950) is an Austrian economist, emeritus professor of economics, and an associated member of the Institute Vienna Circle and the Department of Social and Economic History at the University of Vienna.

He is the son of Peter Milford-Hilferding and grandson of Rudolf Hilferding.

He has written extensively on the works of Karl Popper and on the epistemological views of Carl Menger and other representatives of the Austrian School of economics. He teaches history of economics, philosophy of science and philosophy of social science at the University of Vienna.

== Selected works ==
- 1981: Normalsatzpositionen als Begründungsversuche der theoretischen Ökonomie
- 1986: Zu den Lösungsversuchen des Induktionsproblems und des Abgrenzungsproblems bei Carl Menger
- 2006: Karl Popper: A Centenary Assessment; co-editor with Ian Jarvie and David W. Miller, Ashgate

Volume I: Life and Times, and Values in a World of Facts. Description & Contents.
Volume II: Metaphysics and Epistemology Description & Contents.
Volume III: Science. Description & Contents.
