= Silicon drift detector =

X-ray radiation detector

Silicon drift detectors (SDDs) are X-ray radiation detectors used in x-ray spectrometry (XRF and EDS) and electron microscopy. Their chief characteristics compared with other X-ray detectors are:

- high count rates
- comparatively high energy resolution (e.g. 125 eV for Mn Kα wavelength)
- Peltier cooling

== Working principle ==
Like other solid state X-ray detectors, silicon drift detectors measure the energy of an incoming photon by the amount of ionization it produces in the detector material. This varying ionization produces varying charge, which the detector electronics measure for each incoming photon. In the SDD, this material is high purity silicon with a very low leakage current. The high purity allows for the use of Peltier cooling instead of the traditional liquid nitrogen. The major distinguishing feature of a SDD is the transversal field generated by a series of ring electrodes that causes charge carriers to 'drift' to a small collection electrode. The 'drift' concept of the SDD (which was imported from particle physics) allows significantly higher count rates coupled with a very low capacitance of the detector.

In older detector designs, the collection electrode is centrally located with an external FET (field effect transistor) to convert the current into a voltage and thus represents the first stage of amplification. Newer designs integrate the FET directly into the chip, which greatly improves energy resolution and throughput. This is due to the reduction of capacitance between anode and FET, which reduces electronic noise.

Other designs move the anode and FET outside of the irradiated area. This causes a slightly longer response time, which leads to a slightly lower throughput (750,000 counts per second instead of 1,000,000). However, due to the smaller anode size, this leads to better energy resolutions (down to 123 eV for Mn Kα wavelength). Combined with improved or adapted signal processing, it is possible to maintain the silicon drift detector's energy resolution up to 100,000 counts per second.
