= Joulter Cays =

Islands in the Bahamas

- Location within Bahamas

Geography
- Location: Atlantic Ocean
- Coordinates: 25°16′N 78°07′W
- Type: Cay
- Archipelago: Lucayan Archipelago

Administration
- Bahamas

Demographics
- Population: 0

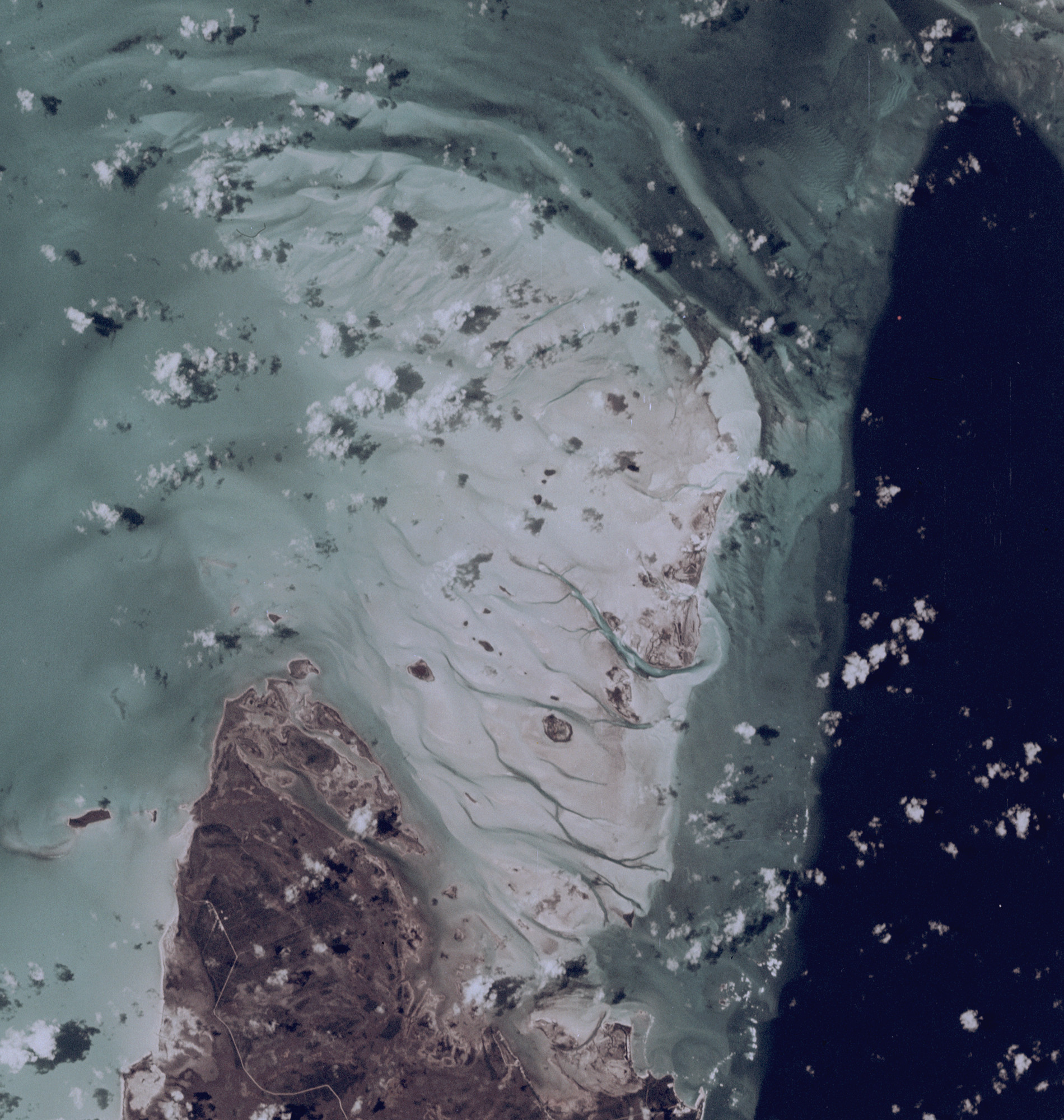
Joulter Cays and associated sand shoals (1984)

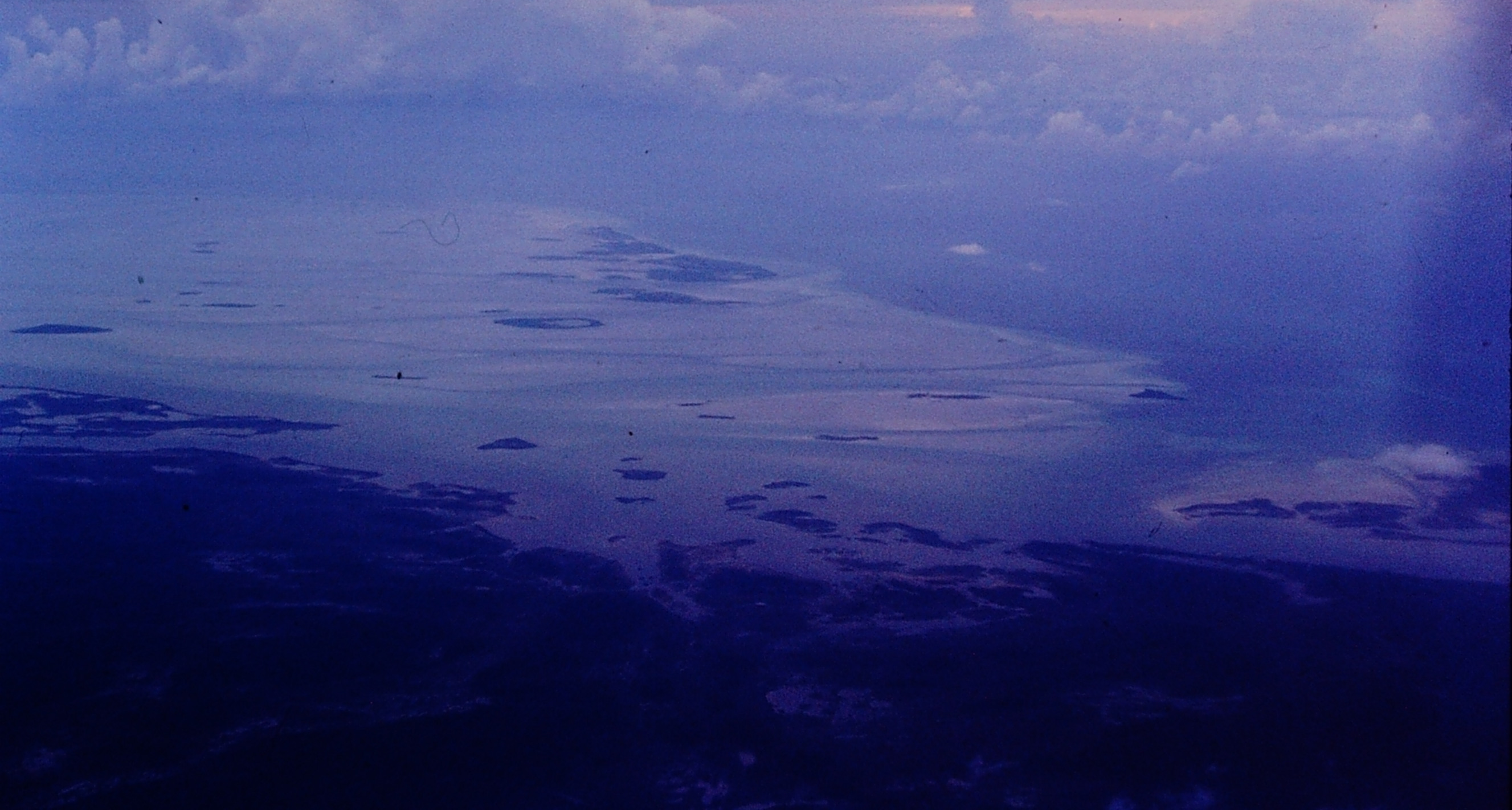
Oblique view (1999)

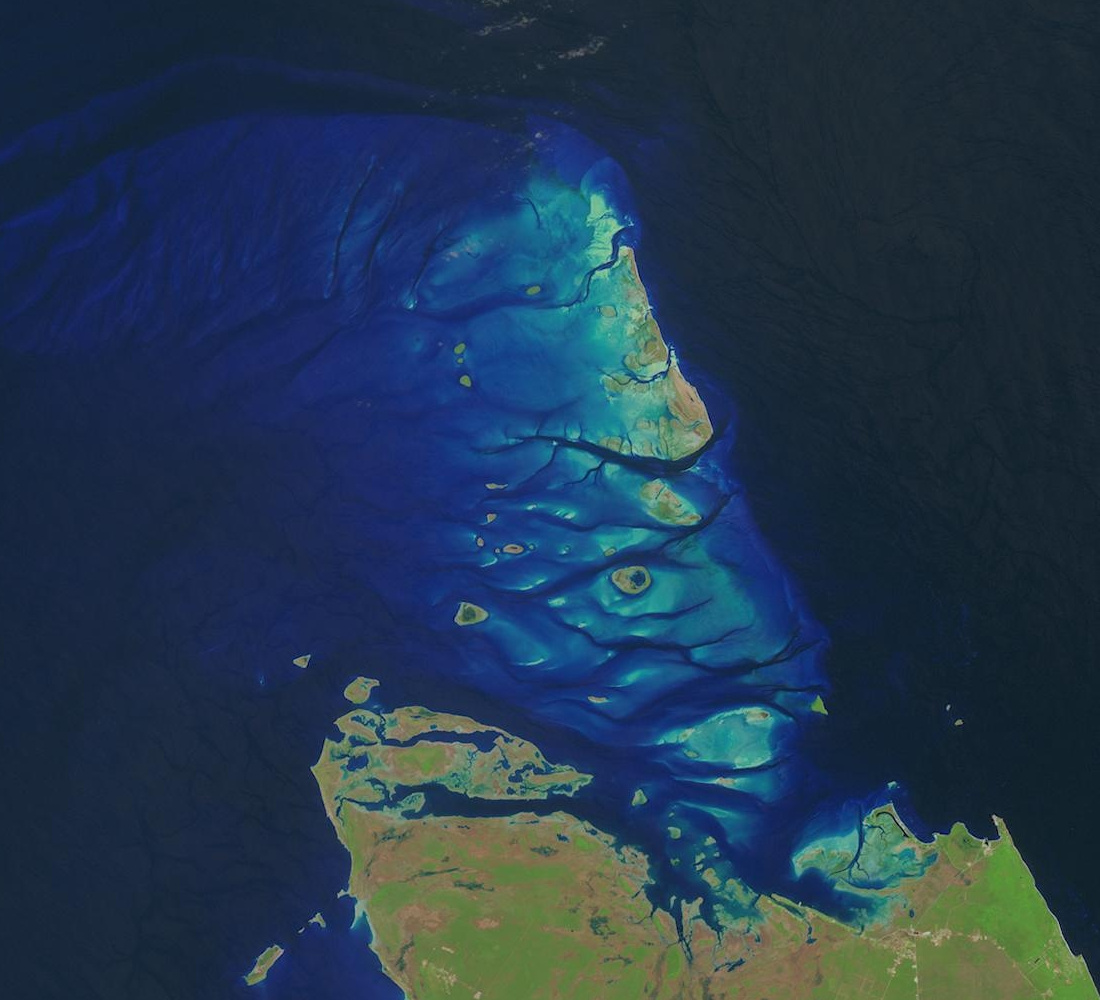
Landsat (2001)

The Joulter Cays are small uninhabited islands to the north of Andros Island in the Bahamas. Oolitic sand dominates the intertidal zone around the small islands that are covered with vegetation.

The Joulter Cays were designated as an Important Bird Area for the endangered piping plover and short-billed dowitcher in 2012. The National Audubon Society's International Alliances Program and the Bahamas National Trust was working together to establish, in 2015, the Joulter Cays as a national park. The islands are known as a flyfishing destination for bonefish and permit.

Matt Jeffery, Deputy Director of Audubon's International Alliances Program, called Joulter Cays a true paradise and treasure of the Bahamas, rich in birds, fisheries, and other wildlife. However, some local residents are concerned that a national park status would prohibit their bonefish guiding service to tourists.
