= Oolitic aragonite sand =

Sand composed of an egg-like form of aragonite

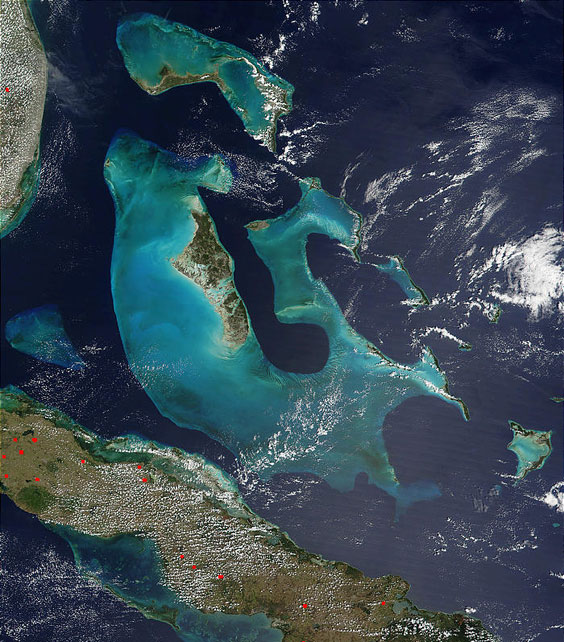
Most of the topography of the Bahama Banks is composed of calcium carbonate oolitic aragonite sand material.

Oolitic aragonite sand is composed of the calcium carbonate mineral aragonite, with an egg-like shape ("oolitic" from the Ancient Greek word ᾠόν for "egg") and sand grain size. This sand type forms in tropical waters through precipitation, sedimentation, and microbial activity, and is indicative of high energy environments. The production of oolitic aragonite sand in the Bahamas surpasses anyplace else in the world. Changes in seawater chemistry and paleoenvironments can be interpreted by the sand's chemical composition and structure.

== Formation ==
Oolitic aragonite sand forms in high-salinity waters that are turbulent, shallow, and warm. The sand starts to form around a nucleus of calcium carbonate, such as a peloid, shell fragment, or foraminifer. The nucleus is coated with a thin layer of crystalline carbonate to form the cortex of the ooid. Compared to other types of sand formation that involve the weathering and erosion of a larger rock by turbulent waters, oolitic aragonite sand is created by dissolved calcium carbonate joining with the cortex or nucleus of the ooid. The dissolved calcium carbonate in seawater continues to stick to the cortex and is combined with the high velocity water which creates the smooth, granular shape resulting in the aragonite composed ooid. Biomineralization involving microbial organic matter likely also plays an important role in ooid formation.

== Localities ==
=== Bahamas ===
Because the waters of The Bahamas are warm with shoals that create turbulence, the conditions for oolitic aragonite sand are optimal and result in a high rate of formation and accumulation. The Great Bahama Banks has been accumulating oolitic sand since the early Cretaceous period and contains the largest reservoir of oolitic aragonite sand in the world.

=== Great Salt Lake, Utah ===
Oolitic sand beaches form on the banks of the Great Salt Lake in Utah, USA including the shorelines of its islands.

== Paleoproxy ==
Scientists use oolitic aragonite sand to reconstruct the route and speed of past currents and ocean circulation patterns. The grain size and sand body size indicate the strength of the current that formed the oolitic sand. The level of turbulence that causes ooids to form such concentric shapes is indicative of intensity of the current. The more circular the ooids, the higher the turbulence, and thus, the more intense the current must have been during ooid formation. The location of ooid accumulation indicates the direction of the current.

== Commercial uses ==
Commercial uses are similar to limestone and other high calcium carbonate materials. One popular use is in reef aquariums.

== See also ==
- List of types of limestone
- Ooids
- Bahama Banks
