= Wavelength-dispersive X-ray spectroscopy =

Chemical analysis technique

- Acronym: WDXS; WDS
- Classification: Spectroscopy
- Analytes: Elements in solids, liquids, powders and thin films
- Manufacturers: Anton Paar, Bruker AXS, Hecus, Malvern Panalytical, Rigaku Corporation, Xenocs, CAMECA, JEOL, Oxford Instruments

Other techniques
- Related: Energy-dispersive X-ray spectroscopy

Wavelength-dispersive X-ray spectroscopy (WDXS or WDS) is a non-destructive analysis technique used to obtain elemental information about a range of materials by measuring characteristic x-rays within a small wavelength range. The technique generates a spectrum in which the peaks correspond to specific x-ray lines, and elements can be easily identified. WDS is primarily used in chemical analysis, wavelength dispersive X-ray fluorescence (WDXRF) spectrometry, electron microprobes, scanning electron microscopes, and high-precision experiments for testing atomic and plasma physics.

== Theory ==
Wavelength-dispersive X-ray spectroscopy is based on known principles of how the characteristic x-rays are generated by a sample and how the x-rays are measured.

=== X-ray generation ===
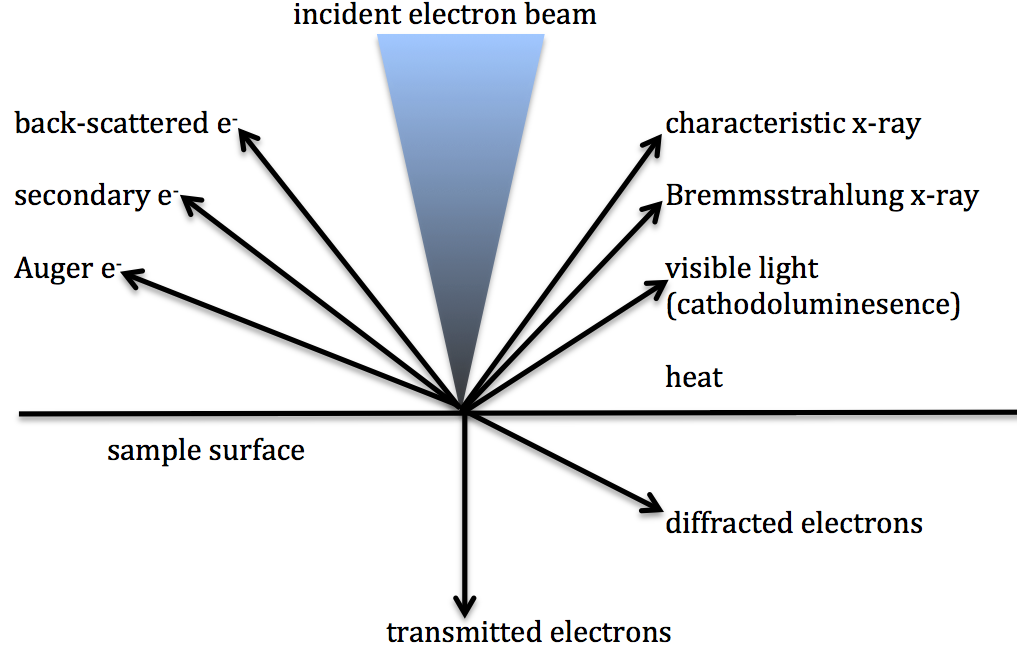
Electron beam interactions with a sample, X-rays are one of the possible products

X-rays are generated when an electron beam of high enough energy dislodges an electron from an inner orbital within an atom or ion, creating a void. This void is filled when an electron from a higher orbital releases energy and drops down to replace the dislodged electron. The energy difference between the two orbitals is characteristic of the electron configuration of the atom or ion and can be used to identify the atom or ion.

The lightest elements, hydrogen, helium, lithium, beryllium up to atomic number 5, do not have electrons in outer orbitals to replace an electron displaced by the electron beam and thus cannot be detected using this technique.

=== X-ray measurement ===
According to Bragg's law, when an X-ray beam of wavelength "λ" strikes the surface of a crystal at an angle "θ" and the crystal has atomic lattice planes a distance "d" apart, then constructive interference will result in a beam of diffracted x-rays that will be emitted from the crystal at angle "θ" if

2d sin θ = nλ,

where n is an integer equal to the n-order diffraction peak that was detected.

In practice, the Bragg's angle of the first-order diffraction peak is used, as this has the greatest intensity and signal, meaning n = 1 with regard to Bragg's law, and therefore n is effectively canceled in the equation. The Bragg's angle and intensity of the second-order peak is used for confirmation of the first-order peak or if peaks from other elements overlap with the first-order one.

This means that a crystal with a known lattice size will deflect a beam of x-rays from a specific type of sample at a pre-determined angle. The x-ray beam can be measured by placing a detector (usually a scintillation counter or a proportional counter) in the path of the deflected beam and, since each element has a distinctive x-ray wavelength, multiple elements can be determined by having multiple crystals and multiple detectors.

To improve accuracy, the x-ray beams are usually collimated by parallel copper blades called a Söller collimator. The single crystal, the specimen, and the detector are mounted precisely on a goniometer with the distance between the specimen and the crystal equal to the distance between the crystal and the detector. It is usually operated under vacuum to reduce the absorption of soft radiation (low-energy photons) by air and thus increase the sensitivity for detection and quantification of light elements (between boron and oxygen). The technique generates a spectrum with peaks corresponding to x-ray lines. This is compared with reference spectra to determine the elemental composition of the sample.

As the atomic number of the element increases, there are more possible electrons at different energy levels that can be ejected, resulting in x-rays with different wavelengths. This creates spectra with multiple lines, one for each energy level. The most prominent peak in the spectrum is labelled K_{α}, the next K_{β}, and so on.

== Applications ==
Applications include analysis of catalysts, cement, food, metals, mining and mineral samples, petroleum, plastics, semiconductors, and wood.

=== Limitations ===
- Analysis is generally limited to a very small area of the sample, although modern automated equipment often uses grid patterns for larger analysis areas.
- The technique cannot distinguish between isotopes of elements as the electron configuration of isotopes of an element is identical.
- It cannot determine the valence state of the element, for example Fe^{2+} vs Fe^{3+}.
- In certain elements, the K_{α} line might overlap the K_{β} of another element and hence if the first element is present, the second element cannot be reliably detected (for example VK_{α} overlaps TiK_{β})

== See also ==
- Electron probe microanalysis
- Elemental mapping
- Energy-dispersive X-ray spectroscopy
- Scanning electron microscopy
- X-ray microtomography
- X-ray spectroscopy
