= Michael Melford (journalist) =

British sportswriter (1916–1999)

Michael Melford

Michael Austin Melford (born 9 November 1916 at St John's Wood, London; died 18 April 1999 at Gerrards Cross, Buckinghamshire) was a sports journalist, primarily writing on cricket but also on rugby union and track and field. He wrote for the Daily Telegraph for 32 years, and was their cricket correspondent from 1975 until his retirement in 1981. He was also the Sunday Telegraph cricket and rugby correspondent from the paper's launch in 1961 to 1975. From 1946 to 1950 he had been the athletics correspondent for The Observer, a position he subsequently held for a while at the Telegraph, covering the Olympic Games in Melbourne in 1956 and in Rome four years later.

His father, Austin Melford, was an impresario and his mother, Jessie Winter, was an actress; Lillie Langtry was his godmother. His brother was the metallurgist David Melford. In spite of his theatrical family background, according to his Wisden obituarist he was conservative and understated, though occasionally wry.

He went to Charterhouse and then studied for a law degree at Christ Church, Oxford from 1935 to 1938. A middle-distance runner, he was awarded Blues in 1936, 1937 and 1938 for appearing for Oxford in the annual athletics fixture against Cambridge. He toured North America as part of an Oxbridge athletics team in 1937.

Melford joined the Royal Artillery in 1939 at the start of World War II, and served in Egypt, Tunisia, Italy and the Balkans. By the end of the war he had attained the rank of major.

He was chairman of the Cricket Writers' Club in 1962 and President in 1985. Wisden wrote of his time as a journalist: "Contemporaries valued him highly for sound, sympathetic judgment, good companionship and the odd decent racing tip."

After retiring from day-to-day cricket reporting, Melford was the ghost writer of Peter May's autobiography A Game Enjoyed. He also continued to write obituaries and to contribute to The Telegraph Cricket Yearbook. He wrote a well-regarded history of post-war cricket entitled After the Interval.

== Bibliography ==
- Barclays World of Cricket (Associate Editor of the 1st edition), 1966.
- Pick of The Cricketer (editor), Hutchinson, 1967.
- Fresh Pick of The Cricketer (editor), The Cricketer, 1969.
- Botham Rekindles the Ashes, Daily Telegraph, 1981, ISBN 0-901684-68-6.
- The Daily Telegraph Cricket Yearbook (editor or co-editor), annually from 1982 to 1988.
- Cricket (Pocket Sports Facts Series (co-edited with Bill Frindall), Telegraph Publications, 1984, ISBN 0-86367-017-2.
- After the Interval, The Crowood Press, 1990, ISBN 1-85223-266-8.
- Denham Described (A History of Denham Golf Club 1910-1992), with Bob Fenning, Grant Books, 1992.

== Sources ==
- Barclays World of Cricket, 2nd edition, Collins, 1980, ISBN 0-00-216349-7, p654.
- "Obituary from The Independent". The Independent. 27 April 1999.
