= Tescan =

Czech scientific-instrument manufacturer

- Type: Subsidiary
- Industry: Electron microscopy; X-ray microtomography
- Founded: 17 July 1991; 35 years ago
- Headquarters: Brno, Czech Republic
- Area served: Worldwide
- Key people: Jean-Charles Chen (CEO)
- Products: Scanning electron microscopes (SEM); FIB–SEM systems; Scanning transmission electron microscopes (STEM); Micro-CT systems; Laser-processing systems
- Revenue: 4,025,588,000 Czech koruna (2024)
- Operating income: 270,959,000 Czech koruna (2024)
- Net income: −63,340,000 Czech koruna (2024)
- Total assets: 7,813,569,000 Czech koruna (2024)
- Owner: Glass SecurityCo s.r.o. (100%)
- Number of employees: 898 (2026)
- Parent: Shimadzu (since 2026)
- Website: www.tescan.com

Tescan (legally Tescan Group, a.s.) is a Czech manufacturer of electron microscopes and other analytical instruments with headquarters in Brno. Its products include scanning electron microscopes, focused-ion-beam scanning electron microscope systems, a scanning transmission electron microscope, X-ray micro-computed-tomography systems and laser-processing systems. These instruments are used in materials science, semiconductor research and manufacturing, the life sciences, and geoscience.

The company was founded in 1991 by five former employees of Tesla Brno. It initially repaired and modified older electron microscopes and made accessories for them, before beginning to manufacture its own instruments in the second half of the 1990s. In 2013, Tescan acquired the French company Orsay Physics, a supplier of ion columns, and the two businesses became part of Tescan Orsay Holding. By 2019, the group exported 95 percent of its production and its instruments were used in more than 80 countries.

Carlyle became the majority shareholder at the end of 2022. In July 2026, Shimadzu acquired Tescan and made it a wholly owned subsidiary.

== History ==
=== Founding and early development (1991–2000) ===
Tescan was founded in Brno in 1991 by Jaroslav Klíma, Josef Melkes, Petr Peřina, Ivan Dvořák and Jan Zounek. The five founders had previously worked in research, development or servicing at Tesla Brno, which manufactured electron microscopes in the city during the socialist period. The name Tescan was formed from the words "Tesla" and "scanning".

During its first years, Tescan did not manufacture complete microscopes. It repaired and modified older electron microscopes and produced accessories for them, including programmable control units and digitizers for analog scanning electron microscopes. Its first product, the Tescan Image Processor, enabled images from analog microscopes to be displayed on a monitor, stored on a disk and processed digitally.

In 1994, Tescan began collaborating with Brno University of Technology. Their initial work concerned the development of a scanning tunnelling microscope. The company began assembling complete electron microscopes during the second half of the 1990s. In 1996, it introduced Proxima, its first scanning electron microscope, which was a compact, fully computer-controlled instrument. By 1999, Tescan was producing approximately four microscopes annually. The Proxima was followed by the Vega model, which was subsequently sold in Europe and other markets.

=== Expansion and product development (2001–2012) ===
During the 2000s, Tescan expanded its range of electron microscopes. The Mira model used a field-emission electron gun, while the Lyra, introduced in 2007, combined a focused ion beam with scanning electron microscopy.

During the financial crisis in 2009, Tescan lost almost all orders from the German automotive industry, which had previously been its principal customer segment. The company completed the development of more advanced ultra-high-vacuum instruments intended mainly for universities, where demand had not declined. Although Tescan sold fewer microscopes in 2009 than in the previous year, its revenue increased to CZK 308 million.

By July 2012, Tescan had sold more than 1,200 microscopes in more than 60 countries and employed over 200 people.

=== Tescan Orsay Holding (2013–2022) ===
In August 2013, Tescan's owners acquired the French company Orsay Physics, with which Tescan had worked for five years and from which it obtained ion columns. The two companies subsequently formed Tescan Orsay Holding. Within the group, the Brno operation was responsible for electron-beam technology, while Orsay Physics concentrated on ion-beam technology. The electron- and ion-beam components were integrated into complete systems in Brno, where the group's instruments underwent final assembly. A new building opened at the Brno site in 2013 doubled the company's production capacity.

In 2018, Tescan acquired XRE, a company based in Ghent that developed X-ray micro-computed-tomography systems. The acquisition led to the introduction of micro-CT production in Brno. The size, shielding requirements and different supply chain of the systems required changes to the company's production and logistics processes. By June 2019, the holding had also acquired the German distributor EOS, which became Tescan Germany, and had entered the Japanese market. The company was constructing another building in Brno for micro-CT production and its planned development of transmission electron microscopes.

In 2018, the Brno operation produced approximately 300 microscopes, while the holding recorded revenue of nearly US$109 million. By 2021, the group employed more than 750 people and recorded sales of CZK 2.5 billion.

In late 2022, Tescan introduced Tensor, a scanning transmission electron microscope. In December 2022, Carlyle agreed to acquire a majority interest in Tescan Orsay Holding, while the existing shareholders retained minority interests.

=== Carlyle and Shimadzu ownership (2023–present) ===
Following Carlyle's majority investment, Tescan became part of the Glass HoldCo corporate group on 31 January 2023, while the previous owners retained minority stakes. Glass BidCo, a company within this holding structure, was renamed Tescan Group in April. On 1 August 2023, the group's principal companies, including Tescan Orsay Holding and Tescan Brno, were merged into Tescan Group, which became their legal successor and continued the existing Tescan operations under a single legal entity.

On 9 July 2024, Tescan entered into a business partnership with Shimadzu Corporation. Under the agreement, Shimadzu added Tescan scanning electron microscopes to its analytical-instrument portfolio for distribution in Japan.

On 25 December 2025, Shimadzu agreed with Carlyle to acquire all shares in Glass HoldCo, which indirectly held all shares in Tescan. The announced acquisition price was approximately US$678 million and remained subject to adjustment when the transaction was completed. Shimadzu completed the acquisition on 10 July 2026 for a final price of US$711 million, making Tescan a wholly owned subsidiary. By July 2026, Tescan had sold more than 4,000 instruments in 80 countries and employed 898 people.

== Products ==
Tescan manufactures scanning electron microscopes (SEM), focused-ion-beam scanning electron microscopes (FIB–SEM) and a scanning transmission electron microscope (STEM). SEMs use an electron beam to examine a specimen's surface, while FIB–SEM systems add an ion beam that can remove material and expose structures beneath the surface. In STEMs, a focused electron probe is scanned across a thin specimen, and electrons transmitted through the specimen are detected to form an image point by point.

Tescan also manufactures X-ray micro-computed-tomography systems, which produce three-dimensional images of an object's internal structure without physically sectioning it. The company additionally produces a laser-processing system for semiconductor analysis that removes material to expose buried structures and prepare cross-sectional surfaces.

The instruments are used in materials science, semiconductor analysis and life-science research. Tescan also supplies automated systems for mineralogical and petrological analysis and micro-computed-tomography systems used to examine geological samples.
