= Malford =

Malford (or Malfourd) is an uncommon given name of Old English origin. It is also used as a surname.

Malford was historically a region of Worcestershire, England, and Christian Malford is a village in Wiltshire, England.

Notable people with this first name include:

- Malford Milligan (born 1959), American singer
- Malford W. Thewlis (1889–1956), American physician and pioneer of gerontology
- Malfourd W. Trumbo (born 1954), American lawyer, politician and judge
