= Energy-dispersive X-ray spectroscopy =

Chemical analysis technique

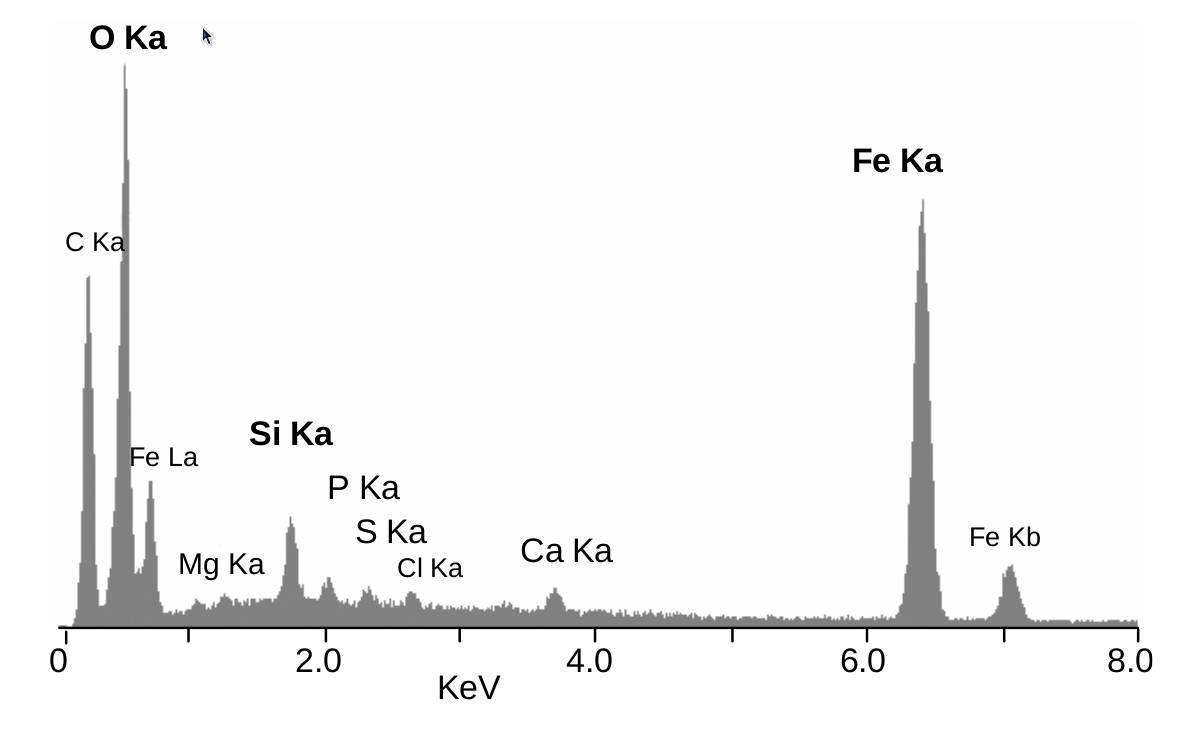
EDS spectrum of the mineral crust of the vent shrimp Rimicaris exoculata. Most of these peaks are X-rays emitted when electrons return to the K electron shell (K-alpha and K-beta lines). One peak is from the L shell of iron.

Energy-dispersive X-ray spectroscopy (EDS, EDX, EDXS or XEDS), sometimes called energy dispersive X-ray analysis (EDXA or EDAX) or energy dispersive X-ray microanalysis (EDXMA), is an analytical technique used for the elemental analysis or chemical characterization of a sample. It relies on an interaction of some source of X-ray excitation and a sample. Its characterization capabilities are due in large part to the fundamental principle that each element has a unique atomic structure allowing a unique set of peaks on its electromagnetic emission spectrum (which is the main principle of spectroscopy). The peak positions are predicted by Moseley's law with accuracy much better than experimental resolution of a typical EDX instrument.

To stimulate the emission of characteristic X-rays from a specimen a beam of electrons or X-ray is focused into the sample being studied. At rest, an atom within the sample contains ground state (or unexcited) electrons in discrete energy levels or electron shells bound to the nucleus. The incident beam may excite an electron in an inner shell, ejecting it from the shell while creating an electron hole where the electron was. An electron from an outer, higher-energy shell then fills the hole, and the difference in energy between the higher-energy shell and the lower energy shell may be released in the form of an X-ray. The number and energy of the X-rays emitted from a specimen can be measured by an energy-dispersive spectrometer. As the energies of the X-rays are characteristic of the difference in energy between the two shells and of the atomic structure of the emitting element, EDS allows the elemental composition of the specimen to be measured.

== Equipment ==
Four primary components of the EDS setup are

1. the excitation source (electron beam or x-ray beam)
2. the X-ray detector
3. the pulse processor
4. the analyzer.

Electron beam excitation is used in electron microscopes, scanning electron microscopes (SEM) and scanning transmission electron microscopes (STEM). X-ray beam excitation is used in X-ray fluorescence (XRF) spectrometers. A detector is used to convert X-ray energy into voltage signals; this information is sent to a pulse processor, which measures the signals and passes them onto an analyzer for data display and analysis. The most common detector used to be a Si(Li) detector cooled to cryogenic temperatures with liquid nitrogen. Now, newer systems are often equipped with silicon drift detectors (SDD) with Peltier cooling systems.

== Technological variants ==
Principle of EDS

The excess energy of the electron that migrates to an inner shell to fill the newly created hole can result in more than the emission of an X-ray. Often, instead of X-ray emission, the excess energy is transferred to a third electron from a further outer shell, prompting its ejection. This ejected species is called an Auger electron, and the method for its analysis is known as Auger electron spectroscopy (AES).

X-ray photoelectron spectroscopy (XPS) is another close relative of EDS, utilizing ejected electrons in a manner similar to that of AES. Information on the quantity and kinetic energy of ejected electrons is used to determine the binding energy of these now-liberated electrons, which is element-specific and allows chemical characterization of a sample.

EDS is often contrasted with its spectroscopic counterpart, wavelength dispersive X-ray spectroscopy (WDS). WDS differs from EDS in that it uses the diffraction of X-rays on special crystals to separate its raw data into spectral components (wavelengths). WDS has a much finer spectral resolution than EDS. WDS also avoids the problems associated with artifacts in EDS (false peaks, noise from the amplifiers, and microphonics).

A high-energy beam of charged particles such as electrons or protons can be used to excite a sample rather than X-rays. This is called particle-induced X-ray emission or PIXE.

== Accuracy ==
EDS can be used to determine which chemical elements are present in a sample, and can be used to estimate their relative abundance. EDS also helps to measure multi-layer coating thickness of metallic coatings and analysis of various alloys. The accuracy of this quantitative analysis of sample composition is affected by various factors. Many elements will have overlapping X-ray emission peaks (e.g., Ti K_{β} and V K_{α}, Mn K_{β} and Fe K_{α}). The accuracy of the measured composition is also affected by the nature of the sample. X-rays are generated by any atom in the sample that is sufficiently excited by the incoming beam. These X-rays are emitted in all directions (isotropically), and so they may not all escape the sample. The likelihood of an X-ray escaping the specimen, and thus being available to detect and measure, depends on the energy of the X-ray and the composition, amount, and density of material it has to pass through to reach the detector. Because of this X-ray absorption effect and similar effects, accurate estimation of the sample composition from the measured X-ray emission spectrum requires the application of quantitative correction procedures, which are sometimes referred to as matrix corrections.

== Emerging technology ==
There is a trend towards a newer EDS detector, called the silicon drift detector (SDD). The SDD consists of a high-resistivity silicon chip where electrons are driven to a small collecting anode. The advantage lies in the extremely low capacitance of this anode, thereby utilizing shorter processing times and allowing very high throughput. Benefits of the SDD include:

1. High count rates and processing,
2. Better resolution than traditional Si(Li) detectors at high count rates,
3. Lower dead time (time spent on processing X-ray event),
4. Faster analytical capabilities and more precise X-ray maps or particle data collected in seconds,
5. Ability to be stored and operated at relatively high temperatures, eliminating the need for liquid nitrogen cooling.

Because the capacitance of the SDD chip is independent of the active area of the detector, much larger SDD chips can be utilized (40 mm^{2} or more). This allows for even higher count rate collection. Further benefits of large area chips include:

1. Minimizing SEM beam current allowing for optimization of imaging under analytical conditions,
2. Reduced sample damage and
3. Smaller beam interaction and improved spatial resolution for high speed maps.

Where the X-ray energies of interest are in excess of ~ 30 keV, traditional silicon-based technologies suffer from poor quantum efficiency due to a reduction in the detector stopping power. Detectors produced from high density semiconductors such as cadmium telluride (CdTe) and cadmium zinc telluride (CdZnTe) have improved efficiency at higher X-ray energies and are capable of room temperature operation. Single element systems, and more recently pixelated imaging detectors such as the high energy X-ray imaging technology (HEXITEC) system, are capable of achieving energy resolutions of the order of 1% at 100 keV.

In recent years, a different type of EDS detector, based upon a superconducting microcalorimeter, has also become commercially available. This new technology combines the simultaneous detection capabilities of EDS with the high spectral resolution of WDS. The EDS microcalorimeter consists of two components: an absorber, and a superconducting transition-edge sensor (TES) thermometer. The former absorbs X-rays emitted from the sample and converts this energy into heat; the latter measures the subsequent change in temperature due to the influx of heat. The EDS microcalorimeter has historically suffered from a number of drawbacks, including low count rates and small detector areas. The count rate is hampered by its reliance on the time constant of the calorimeter's electrical circuit. The detector area must be small in order to keep the heat capacity small and maximize thermal sensitivity (resolution). However, the count rate and detector area have been improved by the implementation of arrays of hundreds of superconducting EDS microcalorimeters, and the importance of this technology is growing.

== See also ==
- Electron probe microanalysis
- Elemental mapping
- Scanning electron microscopy
- Transmission electron microscopy
- Wavelength-dispersive X-ray spectroscopy
- X-ray microtomography
- X-ray spectroscopy
