= R. J. Dwayne Miller =

Canadian chemist

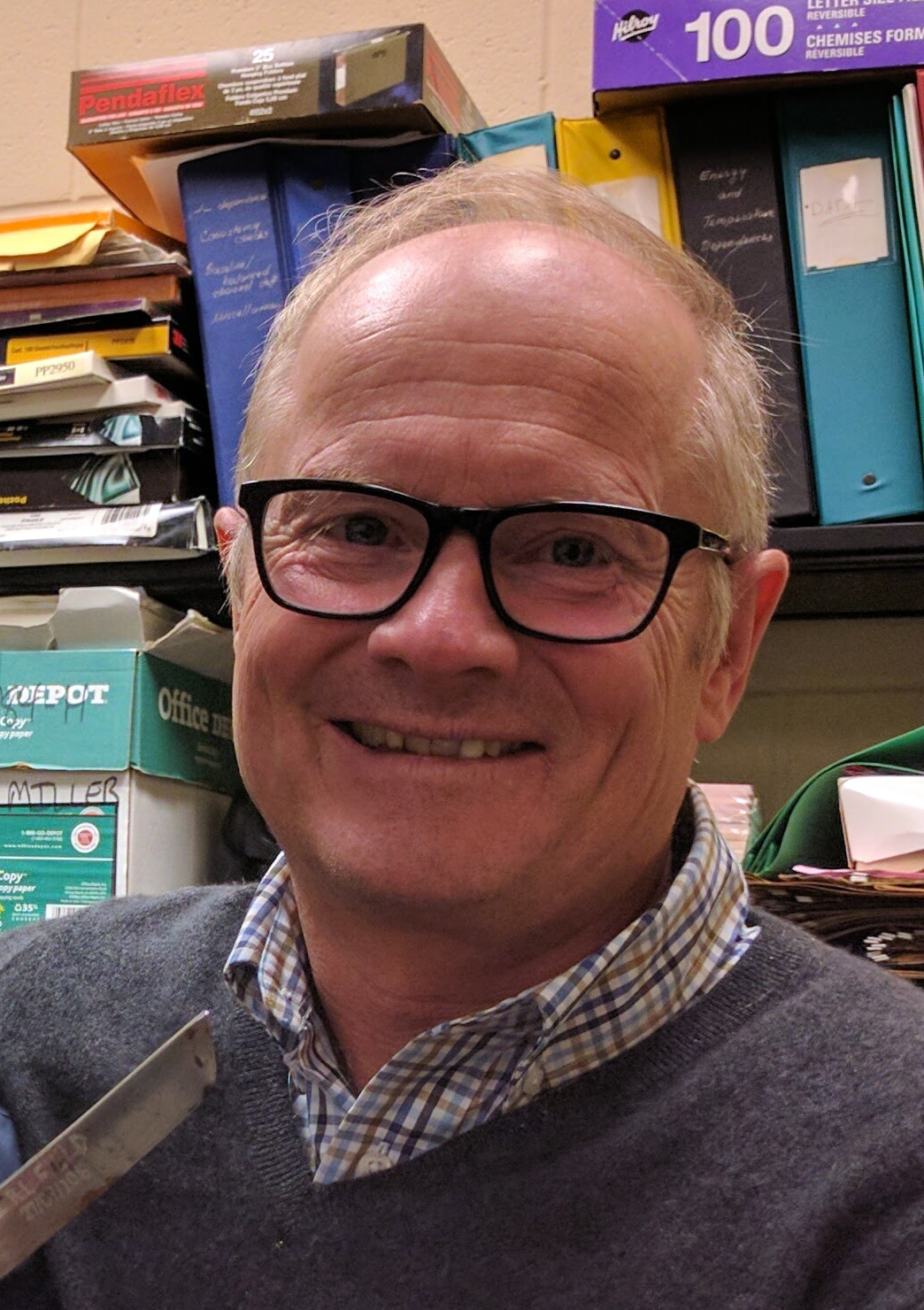
- R. J. Dwayne Miller in 2016
- Born: Robert John Dwayne Miller; Winnipeg, Manitoba, Canada
- Education: University of Manitoba (BSc); Stanford University (PhD)
- Known for: Ultrafast laser spectroscopy; Coherent multidimensional spectroscopy; Femtosecond electron diffraction
- Awards: NATO Science Fellowship (1983); NSF Young Investigator Award (1987); Camille and Henry Dreyfus Teacher-Scholar Award (1988); Sloan Research Fellowship (1988); Guggenheim Fellowship (1992); Rutherford Memorial Medal in Chemistry (1997); FRSC (1998); John C. Polanyi Award (2000); Humboldt Award (2002); Canada Research Chair in Femtoscience (2002); Chemical Institute of Canada Medal (2009); McNeil Medal (2011); E. Bright Wilson Award in Spectroscopy (2015); Centenary Prize (2016); FRSC (2016); EPS-QUEOD Prize for Laser Science and Applications (2018)
- Scientific career
- Fields: Chemistry; Physics
- Workplaces: University of Rochester; University of Toronto; Max Planck Institute for the Structure and Dynamics of Matter
- Thesis: Electronic excited state transport and trapping in disordered systems (1983)
- Doctoral advisor: Michael D. Fayer
- Other academic advisors: Bryan R. Henry
- Website: lphys.chem.utoronto.ca

R. J. Dwayne Miller FRSC FRS is a Canadian chemist and a professor at the University of Toronto. His focus is in physical chemistry and biophysics. He is most widely known for his work in ultrafast laser science, time-resolved spectroscopy, and the development of new femtosecond electron sources that facilitates ultrafast electron diffraction experiments. His research has enabled real-time observation of atomic motions in materials during chemical processes and has shed light on the structure-function correlation that underlies biology.

== Early life and education ==
Miller was born and raised in Winnipeg, Manitoba. In 1978, he received a B.Sc. in chemistry and immunology at the University of Manitoba where Bryan R. Henry was his advisor. He completed his Ph.D. in chemistry at Stanford University in 1983 under the supervision of Michael D. Fayer. His thesis work focused on energy transport in model systems of photosynthesis and is titled Part I, Electronic excited state transport and trapping in disordered systems; Part II, Laser induced ultrasonics.

== Academic career ==
Following graduation, Miller gained a faculty position at the University of Rochester and immediately took a 12-month leave to do postdoctoral research in solid state physics as a NATO science fellow at the Laboratoire de Spectrometrie Physique (renamed to Laboratoire Interdisciplinaire de Physique in 2011) at the Université Joseph Fourier in Grenoble, France under the direction of Hans Peter Trommsdorff and Robert Romenstain. He returned to University of Rochester in 1984 as an assistant professor of chemistry. He was promoted to associate professor in 1988 and then full professor of chemistry and optics in 1992. In 1995, he moved back to Canada and relocated his research group to the departments of chemistry and physics at the University of Toronto. In 2006, he was appointed as a University Professor and later as a Distinguished Faculty Research Chair.

From 2010-2014, R. J. D. Miller was the director of the Max Planck Group, Centre for Free Electron Laser Science/DESY, University of Hamburg. From 2014-2020, he was the co-founding director of Max Planck Institute for the Structure and Dynamics of Matter (MPSD) in Hamburg, Germany.

In 2023, he was inducted as a fellow of the Royal Society and has been a fellow of Royal Society of Canada and the Royal Society of Chemistry since 1999 and 2016, respectively. He is also a member of the Chemical Institute of Canada, Canadian Association of Physicists, American Physical Society, and Optical Society of America.

== Science outreach ==
Beyond his scientific work, Miller is dedicated to the promotion of science education through outreach to school children. He founded and is a board member of Science Rendezvous, an annual science festival that aims to expose general public to science and technology.

== Bibliography ==
=== Selected papers ===
- Duan HG, Jha A, Chen L, Tiwari V, Cogdell RJ, Ashraf K, Prokhorenko VI, Thorwart M, Miller RJD. Quantum coherent energy transport in the Fenna-Matthews-Olson complex at low temperature. PROCEEDINGS OF THE NATIONAL ACADEMY OF SCIENCES OF THE UNITED STATES OF AMERICA, 119 (49) :e2212630119, 2022. https://doi.org/10.1063/4.0000159
- Zhipeng Huang; Meghanad Kayanattil; Stuart A. Hayes; R. J. Dwayne Miller. Picosecond infrared laser driven sample delivery for simultaneous liquid-phase and gas-phase electron diffraction studies. STRUCTURAL DYNAMICS, 9 :054301, 2022. https://doi.org/10.1063/4.0000159
- Gourab Chatterjee, Ajay Jha, Alejandro Blanco-Gonzalez, Vandana Tiwari, Madushanka Manathunga, Hong-Guang Duan, Friedjof Tellkamp, Valentyn I. Prokhorenko, Nicolas Ferré, Jyotishman Dasgupta, Massimo Olivucci and R. J. Dwayne Miller. Torsionally broken symmetry assists infrared excitation of biomimetic charge-coupled nuclear motions in the electronic ground state. CHEMICAL SCIENCE, 13 :9392-9400, 2022. https://doi.org/10.1039/D2SC02133A
- Chiwon Lee, Alexander Marx, Günther H. Kassier & R. J. Dwayne Miller. Disentangling surface atomic motions from surface field effects in ultrafast low-energy electron diffraction. COMMUNICATIONS MATERIALS, 3 (10), 2022. https://doi.org/10.1038/s43246-022-00231-9
- Zhang, M., Zhang, S., Xiong, Y., Zhang, H., Ischenko, A., Vendrell, O., Dong, X., Mu, X., Centurion, M., Xu, H., Miller, RJD., Li, Z.. Quantum state tomography of molecules by ultrafast diffraction. NATURE COMMUNICATIONS, 12 :5441, 2021. https://doi.org/10.1038/s41467-021-25770-6
- P. Mehrabi, R. Bücker, G. Bourenkov, H.M. Ginn, D. von Stetten, H.M. Müller-Werkmeister, A. Kuo, T. Morizumi, B.T. Eger, W.-L. Ou, S. Oghbaey, A. Sarracini, J.E. Besaw, O. Pare´-Labrosse, S. Meier11, H. Schikora, F. Tellkamp, A. Marx, D.A. Sherrell, D. Ax. Serial femtosecond and serial synchrotron crystallography can yield data of equivalent quality: A systematic comparison. SCIENCE ADVANCES, 7 (12) :eabf1380, 2021. https://www.science.org/doi/10.1126/sciadv.abf1380
- Michiel de Kock, Sana Azim, Gunther Kassier, and R. J. Dwayne Miller. Determining the radial distribution function of water using electron scattering: A key to solution phase chemistry. THE JOURNAL OF CHEMICAL PHYSICS, 153 :194504, 2020. https://doi.org/10.1063/5.0024127
- Hong-Guang Duan, Ajay Jha, Xin Li4, Vandana Tiwari, Hanyang Ye, Pabitra K. Nayak, Xiao-Lei Zhu4, Zheng Li, Todd J. Martinez, Michael Thorwart, R. J. Dwayne Miller. Intermolecular vibrations mediate ultrafast singlet fission. SCIENCE ADVANCES, 6 (38) :eabb0052, 2020. https://advances.sciencemag.org/content/6/38/eabb0052
- Cheng, S., Chatterjee, G., Tellkamp, F., Lang, T., Ruehl, A., Hartl, I., Miller, R.J.D.. Compact Ho:YLF-pumped ZnGeP2-based optical parametric amplifiers tunable in the molecular fingerprint regime. OPTICS LETTERS, 45 (8) :2255–2258, 2020. https://doi.org/10.1364/OL.389535
- Krawczyk, K.M., Sarracini, A., Green, P.B., Hasham, M., Tang, K., Paré-Labrosse, O., Voznyy, O., Wilson, M.W.B., Miller, R.J.D.. Anisotropic, Nonthermal Lattice Disordering Observed in Photoexcited PbS Quantum Dots. THE JOURNAL OF PHYSICAL CHEMISTRY C, 125 (40) :22120-22132, 2021. https://doi.org/10.1021/acs.jpcc.1c07064

=== Books ===
- Miller, R. J. Dwayne; McLendon, George L.; Nozik, Arthur J.; Schmickler, Wolfgang; Willig, Frank (1995). Surface Electron Transfer Processes. Wiley VCH. ISBN 978-0471185536.

== See also ==
- John Polanyi
- Arthur Nozik
- Ultrafast electron diffraction
- Time resolved crystallography
- Two-dimensional infrared spectroscopy
- Two-dimensional electronic spectroscopy
- Laser surgery
