= Intrinsic DNA fluorescence =

Physico-chemical phenomenon with biochemistry applications

Intrinsic DNA fluorescence is the fluorescence emitted directly by DNA when it absorbs ultraviolet (UV) radiation. It contrasts to that stemming from fluorescent labels that are either simply bound to DNA or covalently attached to it, widely used in biological applications; such labels may be chemically modified, not naturally occurring, nucleobases.

The intrinsic DNA fluorescence was discovered in the 1960s by studying nucleic acids in low temperature glasses. Since the beginning of the 21st century, the much weaker emission of nucleic acids in fluid solutions is being studied at room temperature by means sophisticated spectroscopic techniques, using as UV source femtosecond laser pulses, and following the evolution of the emitted light from femtoseconds to nanoseconds. The development of specific experimental protocols has been crucial for obtaining reliable results.

Fluorescence studies combined to theoretical computations and transient absorption measurements bring information about the relaxation of the electronic excited states and, thus, contribute to understanding the very first steps of a complex series of events triggered by UV radiation, ultimately leading to DNA damage. The principles governing the behavior of the intrinsic RNA fluorescence, to which only a few studies have been dedicated, are the same as those described for DNA.

The knowledge of the fundamental processes underlying the DNA fluorescence paves the way for the development of label-free biosensors. The development of such optoelectronic devices for certain applications would have the advantage of bypassing the step of chemical synthesis or avoiding the uncertainties due to non-covalent biding of fluorescent dyes to nucleic acids.

== Conditions for measuring the intrinsic DNA fluorescence ==
Due to the weak intensity of the intrinsic DNA fluorescence, specific cautions are necessary in order to perform correct measurements and obtain reliable results. A first requirement concerns the purity of both the DNA samples and that of the chemicals and the water used to the preparation of the buffered solutions. The buffer emission must be systematically recorded and, in certain cases, subtracted in an appropriate way. A second requirement is associated with the DNA damage provoked by the exciting UV light which alters its fluorescence. In order to overcome these difficulties, continuous stirring of the solution is needed. For measurements using laser excitation, the circulation of the DNA solution by means of a peristaltic pump is recommended; the reproducibility of successive fluorescence signal needs to be checked.

== Spectral shapes and quantum yields ==
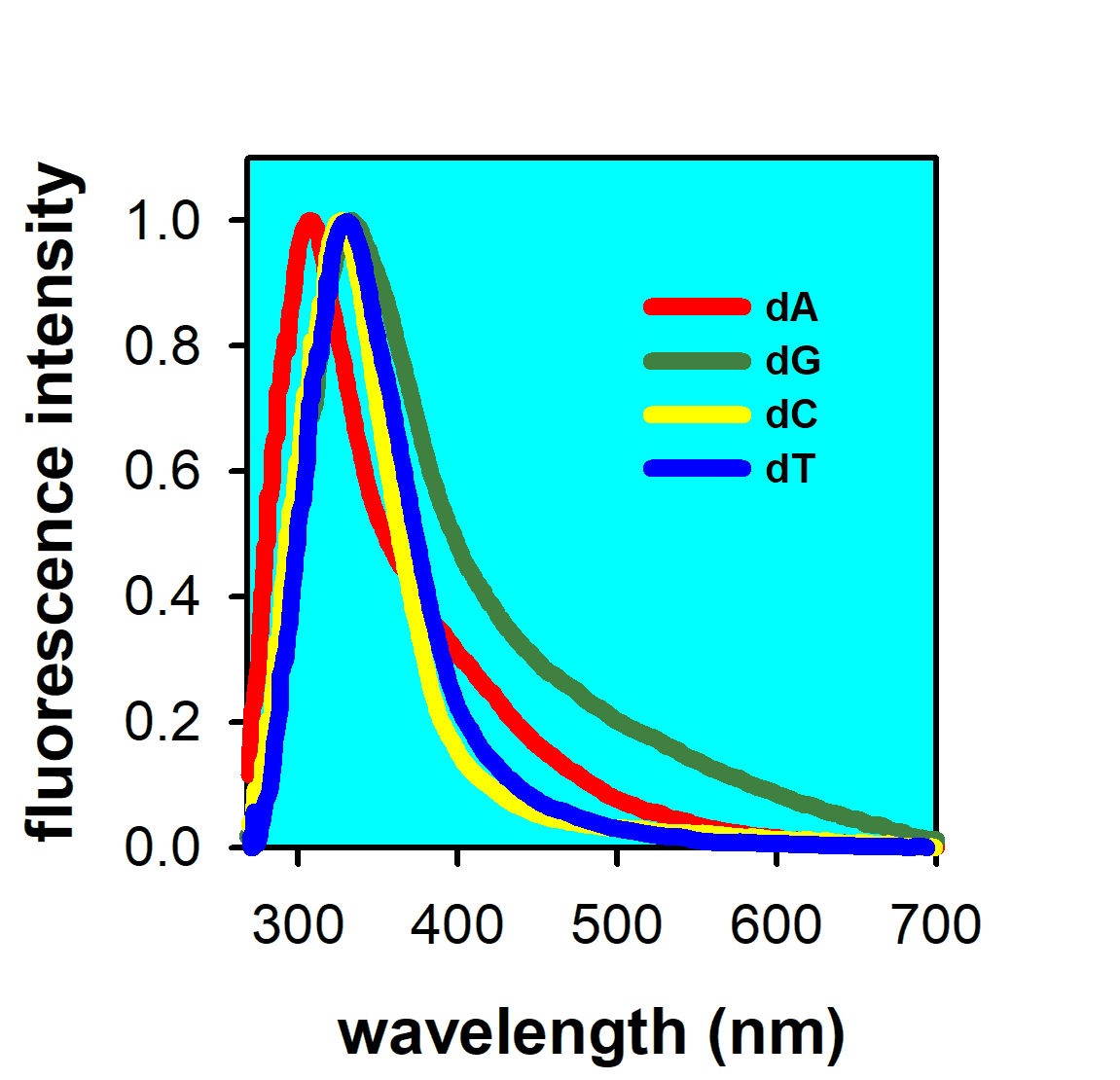
Steady-state fluorescence spectra of the DNA nucleosides normalized to their maximum intensity.

The fluorescence spectra of the DNA monomeric chromophores (nucleobases, nucleosides or nucleotides) in neutral aqueous solution, obtained with excitation around 260 nm, peak in the near ultraviolet (300-400 nm); and a long tail, extending all over the visible domain is present in their emission spectrum.

The spectra of the DNA multimers (composed of more than one nucleobase) are not the sum of the spectra of their monomeric constituents. In some cases, in addition to the main peak located in the UV, a second band is present at longer wavelengths; it is attributed to excimer or exciplex formation.

The duplex spectra are affected by their size and the viscosity of the solution, while those of G-Quadruplexes by the metal cations present in their central cavity. Due to the fluorescence dependence on the secondary structure, it is possible to follow the formation and the melting of G-Quadruplexes by monitoring their emission; and also to detect the occurrence of hairpin loops in these systems.

The fluorescence quantum yields Φ, that is the number of emitted photons over the number of absorbed photons, are typically in the range of 10^{−4}-10^{−3}. The highest values are encountered for G-quadruplexes. The DNA nucleoside thymidine (dT) was proposed as a reference for the determination of small fluorescence quantum yields.

A limited number of measurements were also performed with UVA excitation (330 nm), where DNA single and double strands, but not their monomeric units, absorb weakly. The UVA-induced fluorescence peaks between 415 and 430 nm; the corresponding Φ values are at least one order of magnitude higher compared to those determined with excitation around 260 nm.

The fluorescence of some minor, naturally occurring nucleobases, such as 5-methyl cytosine, N7-methylated guanosine or N6-methyladenine, has been studied both in monomeric form and in multimers. The emission spectra of these systems are red-shifted compared to those of the major nucleobases and give rise to exciplexes.

The emission spectra described in this section are derived from fundamental studies; they may differ from those reported in application-oriented studies, which are shifted to longer wavelengths. The reason is that the latter are usually recorded for solutions with higher concentration. As a result, photons emitted at short wavelengths are reabsorbed by the DNA solution (inner filter effect) and the blue part of the spectrum is truncated.

== Time-resolved techniques ==
The specificity of the intrinsic DNA fluorescence is that, contrary to most fluorescent molecules, its time-evolution cannot be described by a constant decay rate (described by a mono-exponential function). For the monomeric units, the fluorescence lasts at most a few picoseconds. In the case of multimers, the fluorescence continues over much longer times, lasting in some cases, for several tens of nanoseconds. The time constants derived from fittings with multi-exponential functions depend of the probed time window.

In order to obtain a complete picture of this complex time evolution, a femtosecond laser is needed as excitation source. Time-resolved techniques employed to this end are fluorescence upconversion, Kerr-gated fluorescence spectroscopy and time-correlated single photon counting. In addition to the changes in the fluorescence intensity, all of them allow the recording of time-resolved fluorescence spectra and fluorescence anisotropies, which provide information about the relaxation of the excited electronic states and the type of the emitting excited states.

The early studies were performed using time-correlated single photon counting combined with nanosecond sources (synchrotron radiation or lasers). Although they discovered the existence of nanosecond components exclusively for multimeric nucleic acids, they failed to obtain a full picture of the fluorescence dynamics.

== Emitting excited states and their lifetimes ==
=== Monomeric chromophores ===
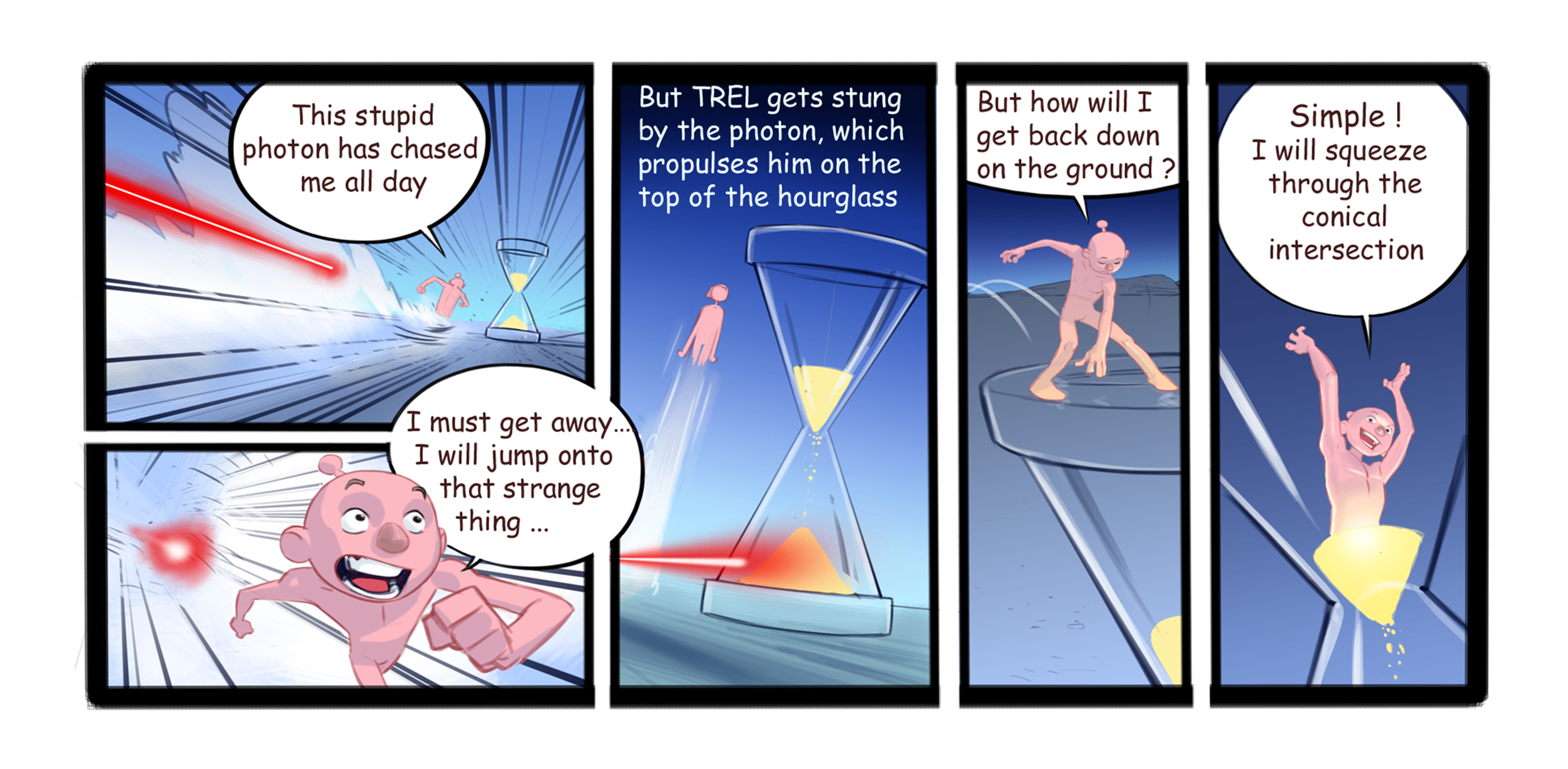
Cartoon representing photon absorption by the chromophore TREL and subsequent ultrafast relaxation through a conical intersection.(European e-knownet project.)

Emission from the monomeric DNA chromophores arises from their lower in energy electronic excited states, that is the ππ* states of the nucleobases. These are bright states, in the sense that they are also responsible for photon absorption.

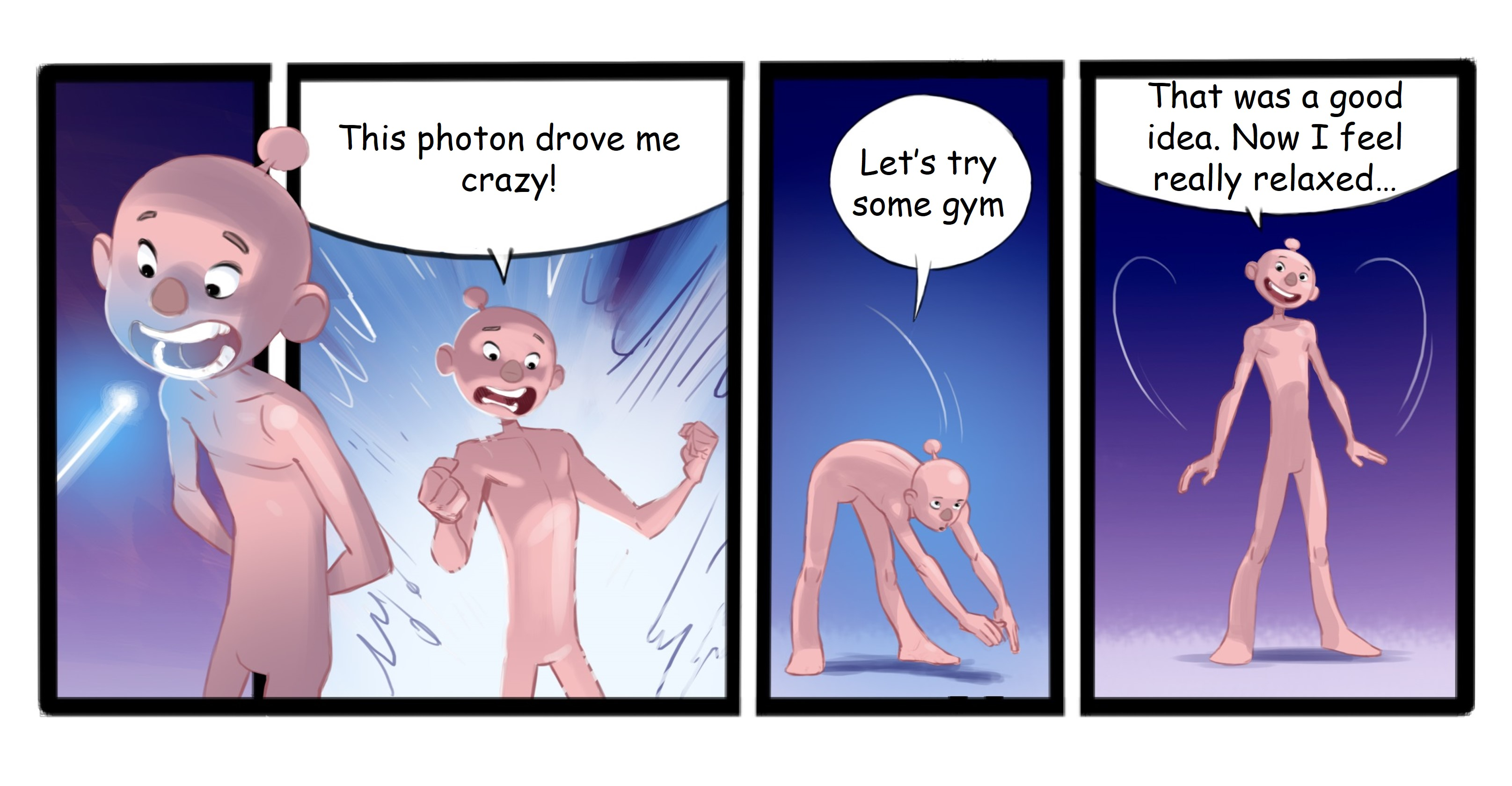
Cartoon representing excited state relaxation via conformational motions.(European e-knownet project.)

Their lifetimes are extremely short: they fully decay within, at most, a few ps. Such ultrafast decays are due to the existence of conical intersections connecting the excited state with the ground state. Therefore, the dominant deactivation pathway is non-radiative, leading to very low fluorescence quantum yields.

The evolution toward the conical intersection is accompanied by conformational movements. An important part of the photons is emitted while the system is moving along the potential energy surface of the excited state, before reaching a point of minimum energy. As the electronic structrure of the chromophores is modified during this time, the fluorescence decays cannot be fitted by mono-expontential functions.

=== Multichromophoric systems ===
Due to their close proximity, nucleobases in DNA multimers may be electronically coupled. This leads to delocalization of the excited states responsible for photon absorption (Franck-Condon states) over more than one nucleobase (collective states). The electronic coupling depends on the geometrical arrangement of the chromophores. Therefore, the properties of the collective states are affected by factors that determine the relative position of the nucleobases. Among others, the conformational disorder characterizing the nucleic acids modulates the coupling values, giving rise to a large number of Franck-Condon states. Each one of them evolves along a specific energy surface.

One can distinguish two limiting types of emitting states in DNA. On the one hand, ππ* states, localized on single nucleobases or delocalized over several of them. And on the other, excited charge transfer states in which an important fraction of an atomic charge has been transferred from one nucleobase to another. The latter are weakly emissive. And between these two types, there is a multitude of emitting states, more or less delocalized, with different amounts of charge transfer. The properties of the emitting states may be modified during their lifetime under the effect of conformational motions of the nucleic acid, occurring on the same time-scale. Because of this complexity, the description of the fluorescence decays by multiexponential functions is only phenomenological.

Experimentally, the different types of emitting states can be differentiated through their fluorescence anisotropy. The charge transfer character of an excited state lowers the fluorescence anisotropy. The decrease of fluorescence anisotropy observed for all the DNA multimers on the femtosecond time-scale was explained by an ultrafast transfer of the excitation energy among the nucleobases.

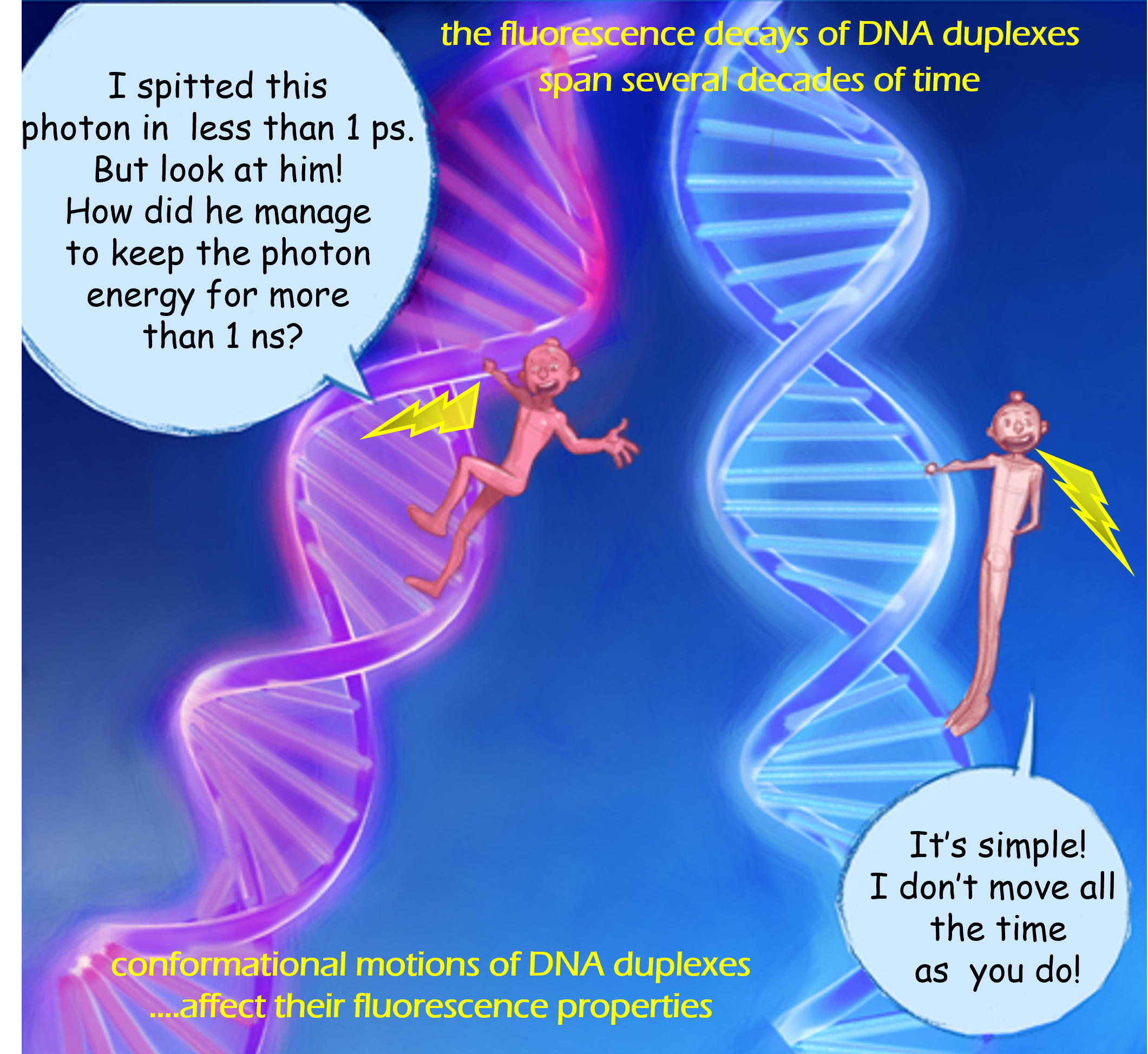
The contribution of the nanosecond components to the duplex fluorescence increases with the local rigidity.(European e-knownet project.)

A particular class of emitting excitons with weak charge transfer character was detected in all types of duplexes, including genomic DNA. Their specificity is that their emission appears at short wavelengths (λ<330 nm) and represents the longest-living components of the overall duplex fluorescence, decaying on the nanosecond timescale. It contrasts with the excimer/exciplex emission, characterized by a pronounced charge transfer character, appearing at long wavelengths and decaying on the sub-nanosecond time-scale. The contribution of the high energy emitting states to the total fluorescence increases with the local rigidity of the duplex (depending on the number of the Watson-Crick hydrogen bonds or the size of the system) and the excitation wavelength. The latter point, associated with the very weak spectral width observed for the most representative example (polymeric duplex with alternating guanine-cytosine sequence) is reminiscent of the emission stemming from J-aggregates.

== Applications ==
The utilization of the intrinsic fluorescence of nucleic acids for various applications has been under scrutiny since 2019. Several approaches have been explored, primarily focusing on the variation of its intensity upon binding of different molecular species to nucleic acids. Thus, target DNA in human serum, Pb^{2+} ions in water, aptamer binding, as well as the interaction of quinoline dyes (commonly used in the food and pharmaceutical industries) were detected.

In parallel, the screening of a large number of sequences was explored by multivariate analysis. The technique of synchronous fluorescence scanning was employed for the authentication of COVID 19 vaccines. And the assessment of the intrinsic fluorescence was included in a multi-attribute analysis of adeno-associated virus. Along the same line, an optical assay has been developed in order to assess the binding to G-Quadruplexes small molecules with potential anticancer properties.

The prospect of probing DNA damage by monitoring the intrinsic fluorescence has been also discussed. This potential application could leverage the short wavelength emission of duplexes, associated with collective excited states whose properties are highly sensitive to the geometrical arrangement of the nucleobases. And the generation of various lesions are known to induce structural distortions.
