= Carlos Silva =

Carlos Silva may refer to:

- Carlos Silva Acuña (born 1970), Mexican chemical physicist
- Carlos Silva (baseball) (born 1979), Major League Baseball starting pitcher
- Carlos Silva (Colombian footballer) (born 1973), Colombian football manager and former footballer
- Carlos Silva (cyclist) (born 1974), Colombian cyclist
- Carlos Silva Echiburu (fl. 1980s), Chilean public official
- Carlos Silva (hurdler) (born 1974), Portuguese hurdler
- Carlos Silva Neder (born 1970), Argentine politician
- Carlos Silva (Portuguese footballer) (1902–?), Portuguese footballer
- Carlos Silva Sánchez (1944), Chilean chess FIDE master
- Carlos Silva (sport shooter) (born 1952), Guatemalan sports shooter
- Carlos Silva (sprinter) (born 1926), Chilean Olympic sprinter
- Carlos Silva Valente (born 1948), Portuguese football referee
- Carlos Alberto Silva (1939–2017), Brazilian football manager
- Carlos Eduardo Silva (born 1994), Brazilian indoor volleyball player
- Chale Silva (1919–2009), Costa Rican footballer

== See also ==
- Carlos da Silva (born 1984), Portuguese footballer
