= John Keith Moffat =

Biophysicist

- Born: 1943 (age 82–83)
- Occupations: Professor; former Deputy Provost
- Employer: University of Chicago
- Scientific career
- Education: University of Edinburgh; King's College, Cambridge
- Known for: Time resolved crystallography
- Awards: Guggenheim Fellowship
- Fields: Biophysics
- Workplaces: University of Chicago; Cornell University
- Doctoral advisor: Max Perutz
- Other academic advisors: Quentin Gibson
- Notable students: Werner G. Krebs
- Website: biophysics.uchicago.edu/the-faculty/keith_moffat/

John 'Keith' Moffat (born 1943) is Louis Block Professor of Biochemistry and Molecular Biology and former Deputy Provost for Research at the University of Chicago. He currently heads BioCARS at Argonne National Laboratory, where he worked on the Advanced Photon Source. He is most noted for his contributions to Time resolved crystallography. He is a former Guggenheim Fellow and former Cornell University faculty member. He has a Ph.D. from King's College, Cambridge under the Nobel laureate Max Perutz at MRC-LMB and an undergraduate degree from the University of Edinburgh. He is married with an adopted son.

== Selected publications ==
- Srajer, V.; Teng, T.-y.; Ursby, T.; Pradervand, C.; Ren, Z.; Adachi, S.-i.; Schildkamp, W.; Bourgeois, D.; Wulff, M.; Moffat, K. (1996). "Photolysis of the Carbon Monoxide Complex of Myoglobin: Nanosecond Time-Resolved Crystallography". Science. 274 (5293): 1726–9. Bibcode:1996Sci...274.1726S. doi:10.1126/science.274.5293.1726. PMID 8939867. S2CID 35873469.
- Crosson, S.; Moffat, K. (2001). "Structure of a flavin-binding plant photoreceptor domain: Insights into light-mediated signal transduction". Proceedings of the National Academy of Sciences. 98 (6): 2995–3000. Bibcode:2001PNAS...98.2995C. doi:10.1073/pnas.051520298. PMC 30595. PMID 11248020.
- Genick, U. K.; Borgstahl, G. E.; Ng, K; Ren, Z; Pradervand, C; Burke, P. M.; Srajer, V; Teng, T. Y.; Schildkamp, W; McRee, D. E.; Moffat, K; Getzoff, E. D. (1997). "Structure of a Protein Photocycle Intermediate by Millisecond Time-Resolved Crystallography". Science. 275 (5305): 1471–5. doi:10.1126/science.275.5305.1471. PMID 9045611. S2CID 20434371.
- Crosson, Sean; Rajagopal, Sudarshan; Moffat, Keith (2003). "The LOV Domain Family: Photoresponsive Signaling Modules Coupled to Diverse Output Domains†". Biochemistry. 42 (1): 2–10. doi:10.1021/bi026978l. PMID 12515534.
- Crosson, S.; Moffat, Keith (2002). "Photoexcited Structure of a Plant Photoreceptor Domain Reveals a Light-Driven Molecular Switch". The Plant Cell Online. 14 (5): 1067–1075. doi:10.1105/tpc.010475. PMC 150607. PMID 12034897.

== See also ==
- List of Guggenheim Fellowships awarded in 1985
- List of University of Chicago faculty
- List of University of Cambridge people
- List of University of Edinburgh people
- List of Cornell University faculty
