= UED =

UED may stand for

- United Earth Directorate, within the context of the Races of StarCraft
- User Environment Design, as a component of Contextual design
- Ultrafast electron diffraction
