= Isao Noda =

Japanese chemical engineer

Isao Noda (born January 29, 1951, in Tokyo, Japan) is a chemical engineer whose research has focused on polymer science and spectroscopy. He holds ninety patents granted in the United States and the EU, has published over three hundred articles, co-authored three books, and received a number of industry-wide awards and recognition for his contributions to his fields of research.

== Education ==
Noda moved to the United States in 1969 to attend Columbia University in the City of New York, where he graduated in 1974 with a B.S. degree in chemical engineering. He subsequently received his M.S. in bioengineering (1976), as well as M. Phil (1978) and Ph.D. (1979) in chemical engineering from Columbia. In 1997, he received a D.Sc degree in chemistry from the University of Tokyo.

== Career ==
In 1978, Noda joined Procter & Gamble, where he became an authority in the field of polymer science, specializing in a type of biopolymer, polyhydroxyalkanoates (PHA). Noda developed medium-chain-length branched polyhydroxyalkanoates (mcl-PHA). The most promising PHA product developed during this time was trademarked as Nodax. After retiring from Procter & Gamble in 2012, he accepted a position as adjunct professor at the University of Delaware, where, as of 2014, he continues to teach and research in the areas of polymer science and spectroscopy.

Noda developed a novel class of bio-based biodegradable plastics and received multiple awards for his development of two-dimensional infrared (2D IR) correlation spectroscopy. In February 2013, he became Senior Vice President of Innovation at Meredian Holdings Group Inc., which recently announced the start up of the world's largest production facility for mcl-PHAs.

== Selected awards ==
- 1991 – William F. Meggers Award from the Society for Applied Spectroscopy presented at 19th Annual Meeting of the Federation of Analytical Chemistry and Spectroscopy Societies, Anaheim, CA, October 8, 1991.
- 2002 – Williams-Wright Award from the Coblentz Society presented at Pittsburgh Conference (Pittcon 2002), New Orleans, LA, March 19, 2002.
- 2005 – Cincinnati Chemist of the Year Award from the Cincinnati Section of the American Chemical Society, Cincinnati, OH, February 16, 2005.
- 2008 – International Academic Cooperation and Exchange Medal from Chinese Chemical Society and Chinese Optical Society presented at 15th National Conference on Molecular Spectroscopy, Beijing, China, October 19, 2008.
- 2009 – Gold Medal from the New York Section of the Society for Applied Spectroscopy presented at Eastern Analytical Symposium and Exposition, Somerset, NJ, November 18, 2009.
- 2011 – Bomem-Michelson Award from the Coblentz Society presented at Pittcon 2011, Atlanta GA, March 15, 2011.
- 2011 – Ellis R. Lippincott Award from the Optical Society of America, the Coblentz Society, and the Society for Applied Spectroscopy presented at FACSS 2011, Reno, NC, October 5, 2011. The following year he was elected a Fellow of OSA.

== Books ==
- I. Noda and D. N. Rubingh, Eds., Polymer Solutions, Blends, and Interfaces (Proc. Procter & Gamble UERP Symp.), Elsevier: New York, 1992.
- Y. Ozaki and I. Noda, Eds. Two-Dimensional Correlation Spectroscopy, AIP Conference Proceedings 503, AIP: Melville, 2000.
- I. Noda and Y. Ozaki, Two-Dimensional Correlation Spectroscopy — Applications in Vibrational and Optical Spectroscopy, Wiley: Chichester, UK, 2004.
