= Fluorescence upconversion =

Ultrafast laser spectroscopic technique

Fluorescence upconversion (FU) is an ultrafast laser spectroscopic technique. It is a variant of sum-frequency generation (of which the second-harmonic generation (SHG) is a special case) but applied to the detection of the incoherent fluorescence. It is therefore closely related to the Optical Kerr Gating (OKG) technique. FU has become a widely used tool in the field of Femtochemistry, the study of chemical reactions on very short timescales.

Fluorescence upconversion should not be confused with photon upconversion, sometimes called upconversion fluorescence.

== Description ==
Fluorescence upconversion (FU) is a time-resolved spectroscopic technique which relies on the use of ultrashort laser pulses, typically a hundred femtoseconds or less. It is a pump-probe technique with the two pulses separated in time by a controllable time-delay. The most striking characteristic of FU is that the time resolution is only limited by the laser pulse duration, which today easily is < 100 femtoseconds. Two early technical reviews, written by Jagdeep Shah and Paul Barbara respectively, describe the FU technique in detail. Some more recent reviews give additional information.

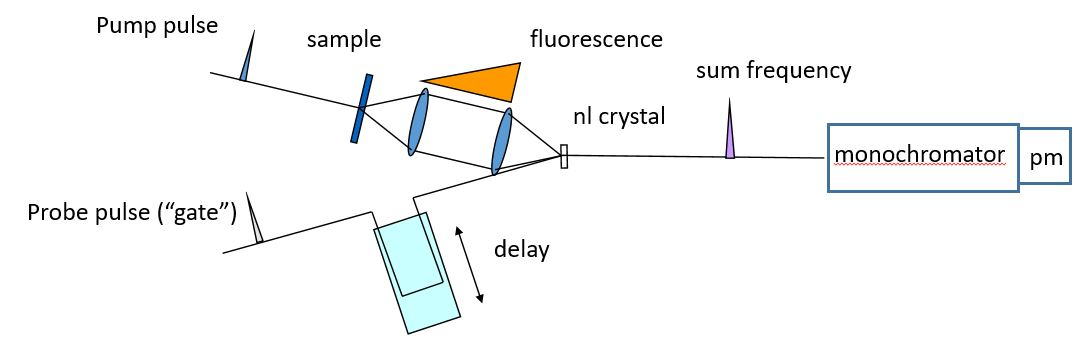
Simplified scheme of a fluorescence upconversion setup

Briefly, a fairly strong pump pulse excites the sample, generating the fluorescence (at a frequency ν_{F}) which is collected and focused in a nonlinear optical crystal. In parallel, an intense probe pulse (also called gate pulse, at a frequency ν_{G}) is focused and superposed with the fluorescence in the crystal. The instantaneous interaction of the fluorescence and the probe pulse in the crystal allows the generation of sum-frequency light at a frequency ν_{S} = ν_{G} + ν_{F} (where ν is the frequency). It is important that the fluorescence and the probe pulses arrive simultaneously (or nearly) in the crystal - to this purpose the probe pulse is directed through a controllable optical delay stage.

Simply speaking, the probe (gate) pulse represents a "time window" during which the fluorescence is detected. An important advantage of this technique is that the intensity of the detected signal (the sum frequency light) is directly proportional to the intensity of the fluorescence. Since the sum frequency light appears at shorter wavelengths than the fluorescence, a monochromator or an optical filter can be used to suppress both fluorescence and diffused laser light, allowing for a high signal-to-noise ratio when detected, for example, by a photo-multiplier.

== History ==
The first demonstration of the FU technique was reported by Mahr and Hirsch in 1975. They used FU to compare the time-profiles of the green laser pulses generated by a mode-locked argon laser with the red laser pulses emitted from a Rhodamine 6G dye laser. In the latter case they found a much longer-lived (several nanoseconds) component, assigned to spontaneous emission (fluorescence). Soon after, Hirsch and coworkers used the FU technique to study the photochemistry of bacteriorhodopsin. They measured the emission lifetime of bacteriorhodopsin at physiological temperatures to be 15 +/- 3 ps.

Among the first applications of FU with sub-picosecond time-resolution was the study of dynamic solvent effects. This topic is generally called solvation dynamics. Briefly, solvation dynamics can be studied by following the time-evolution of the fluorescence spectrum of an "inert" fluorescent probe molecule in solution. This provides the Time-Dependent Fluorescence Stokes Shift (TDFSS).

Hallidy and Topp were the first to study solvation dynamics using FU. They characterized the temperature-dependence of the evolution of the fluorescence spectrum in terms of two independent relaxation processes: solvation dynamics and solvent-assisted fluorescence quenching.

Graham Fleming and coworkers also studied solvation dynamics in various low-viscous room-temperature solvents using FU. They distinguished various solvation processes, from slower long-range diffusional processes to ultrafast inertial effects in the first solvation shell.

Another possible origin of the observed Stokes shift in polyatomic molecules is intramolecular vibrational relaxation which was characterized using FU notably by the group of Wolfgang Kaiser.

The group of Paul Barbara used FU to study not only solvation dynamics and vibrational relaxation but also excited-state intramolecular proton transfer in various organic molecules.

Today, the number of articles using FU found by Web of Science (august 2025) exceeds 1200 but this is certainly an underestimation.

== Kinetic and spectral recordings ==
The most straight-forward application of fluorescence upconversion is to scan the optical delay (see above) between the fluorescence (i.e. the excitation pulse) and the gating pulse for fixed settings of the crystal etc. This provides kinetic traces of the fluorescence intensity at a given wavelength. However, it is more interesting to monitor the time-evolution of the full fluorescence spectrum which is difficult since the FU technique has a very limited spectral bandwidth (<10 nm). To overcome this problem several approaches can be used.

The most widely used method is to reconstruct the time-resolved fluorescence spectrum a posteriori from a number of individual kinetic traces recorded at different wavelengths.

Alternatively, a step-wise scanning can be performed, where, for a given delay, the monochromator is scanned in wavelength while the phase-matching angle is optimized.

True broadband detection of the upconversion signal can in principle be obtained with a spectrograph equipped with a CCD camera. However, as mentioned above, the limited bandwidth of the crystal does not allow to cover the whole fluorescence spectrum. An elegant approach to overcome this problem is to rapidly rotate the crystal during the measuring time.

A much more advanced approach has been developed by Ernsting and coll. who adjust the wavelength-dependent angular dispersion of the focused fluorescence in order to fulfill phase-matching conditions over a wide spectral range.
