= Carlos Silva Acuña =

Chemical physicist

Carlos Silva Acuña APS Fellow, FRSC
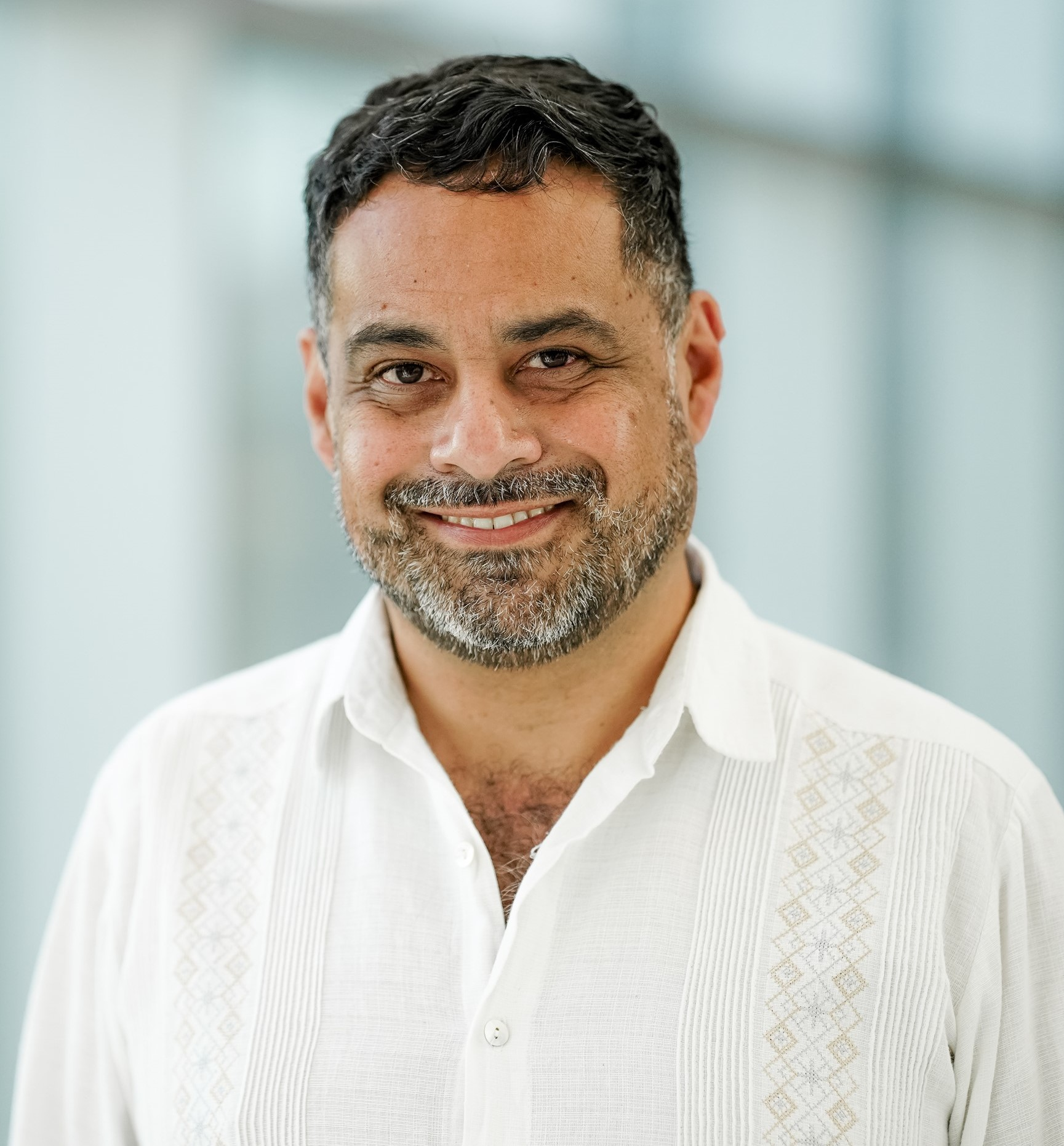
- Carlos Silva Acuña at Université de Montréal in 2024
- Born: June 14, 1970
- Education: Luther College (B.A.), University of Minnesota (Ph.D.)
- Scientific career
- Fields: Physics, chemistry, ultrafast and coherent spectroscopy, strongly correlated quantum materials, semiconductors materials, optical properties of materials, materials science, quantum mechanics
- Workplaces: Université de Montréal; Georgia Institute of Technology; University of Cambridge
- Doctoral advisor: Paul Barbara
- Website: silvascience.org

Carlos Silva Acuña, a native of Mexico and a Canadian citizen, is a chemical physicist. He serves as a full professor in the Departments of Physics and Chemistry at the Université de Montréal and holds the Canada Excellence Research Chair in Light-Matter Interactions. He has been the Director of the Institut Courtois since July 2023. He is known for his work on ultrafast and nonlinear spectroscopy of advanced materials.

== Education ==
Carlos Silva Acuña earned a bachelor's degree in Chemistry from Luther College in 1992. He completed a Ph.D. in Chemical Physics at the University of Minnesota in 1998, supervised by the late Professor Paul Barbara. Afterward, he conducted postdoctoral research at the Cavendish Laboratory, University of Cambridge, where he worked under the supervision of Professor Sir Richard Friend. During this period, he developed his program in ultrafast spectroscopy of materials.

== Career ==
Carlos Silva Acuña began his career as an EPSRC Advanced Research Fellow (ARF) at the University of Cambridge and served as a Nonstipendiary Research Fellow at Darwin College, Cambridge. From 2005 to 2018, he was a professor in the Department of Physics at the Université de Montréal, where he held a Canada Research Chair in Organic Semiconductor Materials. In 2017, he took a joint appointment at the Georgia Institute of Technology, where he was a professor in the Schools of Chemistry and Biochemistry and Physics, and a courtesy professor in the School of Materials Science and Engineering.

== Research ==
Carlos Silva Acuña is recognized for his work in nonlinear coherent optical spectroscopy of organic and hybrid semiconductor materials.

As a postdoctoral research fellow and later an EPSRC Advanced Research Fellow at the University of Cambridge he established an ultrafast spectroscopy research program in the Optoelectronics Group of the Cavendish Laboratory. His early research focused on exciton physics in conjugated polymers and the electronic dynamics in polymer donor:acceptor blends.

In 2005, at Université de Montréal, Carlos Silva Acuña set up an ultrafast spectroscopic laboratory, focusing on the relaxation dynamics of photogenerated carriers in organic semiconductors.

In 2018, he joined Georgia Tech, where he and his team established a laboratory specializing in nonlinear ultrafast spectroscopy and quantum optics. Their work aimed at understanding the optical and electronic properties of molecular and hybrid semiconductor materials, with a focus on hybrid organic-inorganic metal-halides, quantum materials, and conjugated polymers.

In 2023, he returned to Université de Montréal as the holder of a Canada Excellence Research Chair (CERC) in Light-Matter Interactions. His research under the CERC program aims to advance the understanding of the properties of microscopic systems composed of many interacting light-induced particles in solid-state materials. This research has potential applications photonics and quantum technologies.

== DEI ==
Carlos Silva Acuña emphasizes the importance of diversity, equity, and inclusion (DEI) in science, technology, engineering, and mathematics (STEM). He believes that scientific research and academic progress benefit from a diverse and inclusive talent pool. His research group reflects this commitment, and he is active in promoting inclusivity within the academic community.

Through his Canada Excellence Research Chair (CERC) in Light-Matter Interaction, Silva Acuña support Parité Sciences (PS), a project aimed at achieving gender parity in STEM fields. Parité Sciences provides training to Cégep and high-school STEM educators across Québec to create a more equitable environment for future scientists.

== Awards and honours ==
In 2005, Carlos Silva Acuña was granted a Canada Research Chair in Organic Semiconductor Materials, which was renewed in 2010. In the same year, he received the Herzberg Medal from the Canadian Association of Physicists, recognizing his contributions to physics.

In 2011, he was granted a Visiting Professorship by the Leverhulme Trust for his visit to Imperial College London. In 2014, he was appointed to the Université de Montréal Research Chair in Organic Semiconductor Materials.

In 2016, Silva Acuña received the Brockhouse Medal by the Canadian Association of Physicists for his work in condensed matter and materials physics.

In 2023, Silva Acuña was awarded the Canada Excellence Research Chair in Light-Matter Interactions and the Institut Courtois Director's Research Chair, for his leadership in light–matter interactions research.

In 2024, Silva Acuña was named a finalist in the 16th annual TLN 10 Most Influential Hispanic Canadians.
