= Ultrafast electron diffraction =

Electron diffraction using very short pulses

Ultrafast electron diffraction (UED), also known as femtosecond electron diffraction, is a pump-probe experimental method based on the combination of optical pump-probe spectroscopy and electron diffraction. UED provides information on the dynamical changes in the structure of materials such as those undergoing phase transitions or chemical reactions. It is conceptually similar to time-resolved crystallography, but instead of using X-rays as the probe, it uses electrons. UED can provide a wealth of dynamics on charge carriers, atoms, and molecules.

The technique uses a femtosecond (10^{–15} second) laser optical pulse to promote (pump) a sample into an excited, usually non-equilibrium state. The pump pulse may induce chemical, electronic, or structural transitions. After a finite time interval, a short (with a duration in femtoseconds or picoseconds) electron pulse is incident upon the sample, which interacts with and diffracts off the underlying atomic structure. The diffraction signal is, subsequently, detected by an electron counting instrument such as a charge-coupled device camera or a direct electron detector similar to detection methods in electron microscopy. Specifically, the detectors measure diffraction patterns, which contain structural information about the sample. By adjusting the time difference between the arrival (at the sample) of the pump and probe beams, one can obtain a series of diffraction patterns as a function of the various time differences. The diffraction data series can be concatenated in order to produce a motion picture of the changes that occurred in the data.

== History ==
The design of early UED instruments was based on X-ray streak cameras, the first reported UED experiment demonstrating an electron pulse length of 100 picoseconds (10^{–10} seconds). The temporal resolution of ultrafast electron diffraction has been reduced to the attosecond (10^{–18} second) time scale to perform attosecond electron-diffraction measurements which reveal electron motion dynamics.

== Electron pulse production ==
The electron pulses are typically produced by the process of photoemission, in which a femtosecond optical pulse is directed toward a photocathode. If the incident laser pulse has an appropriate energy, then electrons will be ejected from the photocathode. The electrons are subsequently accelerated to high energies, ranging from tens of kiloelectronvolts to several megaelectronvolts, using an electron gun.

== Electron pulse compression ==
Generally, two methods are used in order to compress electron pulses in order to overcome pulsewidth expansion due to Coulomb repulsion. Generating high-flux ultrashort electron beams has been relatively straightforward, but pulse duration below a picosecond proved extremely difficult due to space-charge effects. Space-charge interactions increase in severity with bunch charge and rapidly act to broaden the pulse duration, which has resulted in an apparently unavoidable tradeoff between signal (bunch charge) and time-resolution in UED experiments. Radio-frequency (RF) compression has emerged has a leading method of reducing the pulse expansion in ultrafast electron-diffraction experiments, achieving temporal resolution well below 50 femtoseconds. Shorter electron beams below 10 femtoseconds are ultimately required to probe the fastest dynamics in solid-state materials and observe gas-phase molecular reactions.

== Single shot ==
Schematic of Ultrafast Electron Diffraction showing the pump pulse (red) exciting the sample prior to the arrival of the electron probe pulse (blue)

For studying irreversible process, a diffraction signal is obtained from a single electron bunch containing $10^5$ or more particles.

== Stroboscopic ==
When studying reversible process, especially weak signals caused by, e.g., thermal diffuse scattering, a diffraction pattern is accumulated from many electron bunches, as many as 10^{8}.

== Resolution ==
The resolution of a UED apparatus can be characterized both in space and in time. Spatial resolution comes in two distinct parts: real space and reciprocal space. Real-space resolution is determined by the physical size of the electron probe on the sample. A smaller physical probe size can allow experiments on crystals that cannot feasibly be grown in large sizes.

High reciprocal-space resolution allows for the detection of Bragg diffraction spots that correspond to long-periodicity phenomena. It can be calculated with the equation

$$\Delta s = \frac{2\pi}{\lambda_e}\frac{\varepsilon_n}{\sigma_x},$$

where Δs is the reciprocal-space resolution, λ_{e} is the Compton wavelength of the electrons, ϵ_{n} is the normalized emittance of the electrons, and σ_{x} is the size of the probe on the sample.

Temporal resolution is primarily a function of the bunch length of the electrons and the relative timing jitters between the pump and probe.

== See also ==
- Ahmed Zewail
- R. J. Dwayne Miller
- Time resolved crystallography

== Sources ==
- Srinivasan, Ramesh; Lobastov, Vladimir A.; Ruan, Chong-Yu; Zewail, Ahmed H. (2003). "Ultrafast Electron Diffraction (UED): A New Development for the 4D Determination of Transient Molecular Structures". Helvetica Chimica Acta. 86 (6): 1761. doi:10.1002/hlca.200390147.
- Sciani, Germain; Miller, R.J. Dwayne (2011). "Femtosecond electron diffraction: heralding the era of atomically resolved dynamics". Reports on Progress in Physics. 74 (9) 096101. Bibcode:2011RPPh...74i6101S. doi:10.1088/0034-4885/74/9/096101. S2CID 121497071.
- Chatelain, Robert P.; Morrison, Vance R.; Godbout, Chris; Siwick, Bradley J. (2012). "Ultrafast electron diffraction with radio-frequency compressed electron pulses". Applied Physics Letters. 101 (8): 081901. Bibcode:2012ApPhL.101h1901C. doi:10.1063/1.4747155.
