= Ultrafast laser spectroscopy =

Spectroscopy with lasers with very short pulses

Ultrafast laser spectroscopy is a category of spectroscopic techniques using ultrashort pulse lasers for the study of dynamics on extremely short time scales (attoseconds to nanoseconds). Different methods are used to examine the dynamics of charge carriers, atoms, and molecules. Many different procedures have been developed spanning different time scales and photon energy ranges; some common methods are listed below.

== Attosecond-to-picosecond spectroscopy ==
Dynamics on the femtosecond time scale are in general too fast to be measured electronically. Most measurements are done by employing a sequence of ultrashort light pulses to initiate a process and record its dynamics. The temporal width (duration) of the light pulses has to be on the same scale as the dynamics that are to be measured or even shorter.

=== Light sources ===
==== Titanium-sapphire laser ====
Ti-sapphire lasers are tunable lasers that emit red and near-infrared light (700 nm- 1100 nm). Ti-sapphire laser oscillators use Ti doped-sapphire crystals as a gain medium and Kerr-lens mode-locking to achieve sub-picosecond light pulses. Typical Ti:sapphire oscillator pulses have nJ energy and repetition rates 70-100 MHz. Chirped pulse amplification through regenerative amplification can be used to attain higher pulse energies. For amplification, laser pulses from the Ti:sapphire oscillator must first be stretched in time to prevent damage to optics, and then are injected into the cavity of another laser where pulses are amplified at a lower repetition rate. Regeneratively amplified pulses can be further amplified in a multi-pass amplifier. Following amplification, the pulses are recompressed to pulse widths similar to the original pulse widths.

==== Dye laser ====
A dye laser is a four-level laser that uses an organic dye as the gain medium. Pumped by a laser with a fixed wavelength, due to various dye types you use, different dye lasers can emit beams with different wavelengths. A ring laser design is most often used in a dye laser system. Also, tuning elements, such as a diffraction grating or prism, are usually incorporated in the cavity. This allows only light in a very narrow frequency range to resonate in the cavity and be emitted as laser emission. The wide tunability range, high output power, and pulsed or CW operation make the dye laser particularly useful in many physical & chemical studies.

==== Fiber laser ====
A fiber laser is usually generated first from a laser diode. The laser diode then couples the light into a fiber where it will be confined. Different wavelengths can be achieved with the use of doped fiber. The pump light from the laser diode will excite a state in the doped fiber which can then drop in energy causing a specific wavelength to be emitted. This wavelength may be different from that of the pump light and more useful for a particular experiment.

==== X-ray generation ====
Ultrafast optical pulses can be used to generate x-ray pulses in multiple ways. An optical pulse can excite an electron pulse via the photoelectric effect, and acceleration across a high potential gives the electrons kinetic energy. When the electrons hit a target they generate both characteristic x-rays and bremsstrahlung. A second method is via laser-induced plasma. When very high-intensity laser light is incident on a target, it strips electrons off the target creating a negatively charged plasma cloud. The strong Coulomb force due to the ionized material in the center of the cloud quickly accelerates the electrons back to the nuclei left behind. Upon collision with the nuclei, Bremsstrahlung and characteristic emission x-rays are given off. This method of x-ray generation scatters photons in all directions, but also generates picosecond x-ray pulses.

=== Conversion and characterization ===
==== Pulse characterization ====
For accurate spectroscopic measurements to be made, several characteristics of the laser pulse need to be known; pulse duration, pulse energy, spectral phase, and spectral shape are among some of these. Information about pulse duration can be determined through autocorrelation measurements, or from cross-correlation with another well-characterized pulse. Methods allowing for complete characterization of pulses include frequency-resolved optical gating (FROG) and spectral phase interferometry for direct electric-field reconstruction (SPIDER).

==== Pulse shaping ====
Pulse shaping is to modify the pulses from the source in a well-defined manner, including manipulation on pulse's amplitude, phase, and duration. To amplify pulse's intensity, chirped pulse amplification is generally employed, which includes a pulse stretcher, amplifier, and compressor. It will not change the duration or phase of the pulse during the amplification. Pulse compression (shortening of the pulse duration) is achieved by first chirping the pulse in a nonlinear material and broadening the spectrum, with the following compressor for chirp compensation. A fiber compressor is generally used in this case. Pulse shapers usually refer to optical modulators which apply Fourier transforms to a laser beam. Depending on which property of light is controlled, modulators are called intensity modulators, phase modulators, polarization modulators, spatial light modulators. Depending on the modulation mechanism, optical modulators are divided into Acoustic-optic modulators, Electro-optic modulators, Liquid crystal modulators, etc. Each is dedicated to different applications.

==== High harmonic generation ====
High harmonic generation (HHG) is a nonlinear process where intense laser radiation is converted from one fixed frequency to high harmonics of that frequency by ionization and recollision of an electron. It was first observed in 1987 by McPherson et al. who successfully generated harmonic emission up to the 17th order at 248 nm in neon gas. HHG is seen by focusing an ultra-fast, high-intensity, near-IR pulse into a noble gas at intensities of 10^{13}–10^{14} W/cm^{2} and it generates coherent pulses in the XUV to Soft X-ray (100–1 nm) region of the spectrum. It is realizable on a laboratory scale (table-top systems) as opposed to large free electron-laser facilities.

High harmonic generation in atoms is well understood in terms of the three-step model (ionization, propagation, and recombination). Ionization: The intense laser field modifies the Coulomb potential of the atom, electron tunnels through the barrier and ionize. Propagation: The free-electron accelerates in the laser field and gains momentum. Recombination: When the field reverses, the electron is accelerated back toward the ionic parent and releases a photon with very high energy.

==== Frequency conversion techniques ====
Different spectroscopy experiments require different excitation or probe wavelengths. For this reason, frequency conversion techniques are commonly used to extend the operational spectrum of existing laser light sources. The most widespread conversion techniques rely on using crystals with second-order non-linearity to perform either parametric amplification or frequency mixing. Frequency mixing works by superimposing two beams of equal or different wavelengths to generate a signal which is a higher harmonic or the sum frequency of the first two. Parametric amplification overlaps a weak probe beam with a higher energy pump beam in a non-linear crystal such that the weak beam gets amplified and the remaining energy goes out as a new beam called the idler. This approach has the capability of generating output pulses that are shorter than the input ones. Different schemes of this approach have been implemented. Examples are optical parametric oscillator (OPO), optical parametric amplifier (OPA), non-collinear parametric amplifier (NOPA).

=== Techniques ===
==== Ultrafast transient absorption ====
This method is typical of 'pump-probe' experiments, where a pulsed laser is used to excite the electrons in a material (such as a molecule or semiconducting solid) from their ground states to higher-energy excited states. A probing light source, typically a xenon arc lamp or broadband laser pulse created by supercontinuum generation, is used to obtain an absorption spectrum of the compound at various times following its excitation. As the excited molecules absorb the probe light, they are further excited to even higher states or induced to return to the ground state radiatively through stimulated emission. After passing through the sample, the unabsorbed probe light continues to a photodetector such as an avalanche photodiode array or CMOS camera, and the data is processed to generate an absorption spectrum of the excited state. Since all the molecules or excitation sites in the sample will not undergo the same dynamics simultaneously, this experiment must be carried out many times (where each "experiment" comes from a single pair of pump and probe laser pulse interactions), and the data must be averaged to generate spectra with accurate intensities and peaks. Because photobleaching and other photochemical or photothermal reactions can happen to the samples, this method requires evaluating these effects by measuring the same sample at the same location many times at different pump and probe intensities. Most time the liquid samples are stirred during measurement making relatively long-time kinetics difficult to measure due to flow and diffusion. Unlike time-correlated single photon counting (TCSPC), this technique can be carried out on non-fluorescent samples. It can also be performed on non-transmissive samples in a reflection geometry.

Ultrafast transient absorption can use almost any probe light, so long as the probe is of a pertinent wavelength or set of wavelengths. A monochromator and photomultiplier tube in place of the avalanche photodiode array allows observation of a single probe wavelength, and thus allows probing of the decay kinetics of the excited species. The purpose of this setup is to take kinetic measurements of species that are otherwise nonradiative, and specifically it is useful for observing species that have short-lived and non-phosphorescent populations within the triplet manifold as part of their decay path. The pulsed laser in this setup is used both as a primary excitation source, and a clock signal for the ultrafast measurements. Although laborious and time-consuming, the monochromator position may also be shifted to allow absorbance decay profiles to be constructed, ultimately to the same effect as the above method.

The data of UTA measurements usually are reconstructed absorption spectra sequenced over the delay time between the pump and probe. Each spectrum resembles a normal steady-state absorption profile of the sample after the delay time of the excitation with the time resolution convoluted from the pump and probe time resolutions. The excitation wavelength is blinded by the pump laser and cut out. The rest of the spectra usually have a few bands such as ground-state absorption, excited-state absorption, and stimulated emission. Under normal conditions, the angles of the emission are randomly orientated and not detected in the absorption geometry. But in UTA measurement, the stimulated emission resembles the lasing effect, is highly oriented, and is detected. Many times this emission overlaps with the absorption bands and needs to be deconvoluted for quantitative analysis. The relationship and correlation among these bands can be visualized using the classical spectroscopic two-dimensional correlation analysis.

==== Time-resolved photoelectron spectroscopy and two-photon photoelectron spectroscopy ====
Time-resolved photoelectron spectroscopy and two-photon photoelectron spectroscopy (2PPE) combine a pump-probe scheme with angle-resolved photoemission. A first laser pulse is used to excite a material, a second laser pulse ionizes the system. The kinetic energy of the electrons from this process is then detected, through various methods including energy mapping, time of flight measurements etc. As above, the process is repeated many times, with different time delays between the probe pulse and the pump pulse. This builds up a picture of how the molecule relaxes over time. A variation of this method looks at the positive ions created in this process and is called time-resolved photo-ion spectroscopy (TRPIS)

==== Multidimensional spectroscopy ====
Using the same principles pioneered by 2D-NMR experiments, multidimensional optical or infrared spectroscopy is possible using ultrafast pulses. Different frequencies can probe various dynamic molecular processes to differentiate between inhomogeneous and homogeneous line broadening as well as identify coupling between the measured spectroscopic transitions. If two oscillators are coupled together, be it intramolecular vibrations or intermolecular electronic coupling, the added dimensionality will resolve anharmonic responses not identifiable in linear spectra. A typical 2D pulse sequence consists of an initial pulse to pump the system into a coherent superposition of states, followed by a phase conjugate second pulse that pushes the system into a non-oscillating excited state, and finally, a third pulse that converts back to a coherent state that produces a measurable pulse. A 2D frequency spectrum can then be recorded by plotting the Fourier transform of the delay between the first and second pulses on one axis, and the Fourier transform of the delay between a detection pulse relative to the signal-producing third pulse on the other axis. 2D spectroscopy is an example of a four-wave mixing experiment, and the wavevector of the signal will be the sum of the three incident wavevectors used in the pulse sequence. Multidimensional spectroscopies exist in infrared and visible variants as well as combinations using different wavelength regions.

2D spectroscopy using ultrafast pulses can be combined with complementary experimental methods to characterize the system under study. Photoelectrochemical measurements of photosynthetic complexes have been correlated with ultrafast pulses to stimulate and probe chromophores involved in photosynthesis and to characterize the charge transfer processes in photosynthetic reaction centers. Since charge separation and transfer is the final, biologically relevant process (in contrast to intermediate excitations and relaxations of the chromophores), the combination of photoelectrochemistry and 2D spectroscopy (PEC2DES) can be considered a form of "action spectroscopy".

==== Ultrafast imaging ====
Most ultrafast imaging techniques are variations on standard pump-probe experiments. Some commonly used techniques are Electron Diffraction imaging, Kerr Gated Microscopy, imaging with ultrafast electron pulses and terahertz imaging. This is particularly true in the biomedical community where safe and non-invasive techniques for diagnosis are always of interest. Terahertz imaging has recently been used to identify areas of decay in tooth enamel and image the layers of the skin. Additionally, it has shown to be able to successfully distinguish a region of breast carcinoma from healthy tissue. Another technique called Serial Time-encoded amplified microscopy has shown to have the capability of even earlier detection of trace amounts of cancer cells in the blood. Other non-biomedical applications include ultrafast imaging around corners or through opaque objects.

==== Fluorescence upconversion ====
Femtosecond fluorescence upconversion is a pump-probe technique that uses nonlinear optics to combine the fluorescence signal and probe signal to create a signal with a new frequency via sum-frequency generation, which is subsequently detected. The probe scans through delay times after the pump excites the sample, generating a plot of intensity over time. Fluorescence upconversion should not be confused with photon upconversion.

=== Applications ===
==== Applications of femtosecond spectroscopy to biochemistry ====
Ultrafast processes are found throughout biology. Until the advent of femtosecond methods, many of the mechanism of such processes were unknown. Examples of these include the cis-trans photoisomerization of the rhodopsin chromophore retinal, excited state and population dynamics of DNA, and the charge transfer processes in photosynthetic reaction centers Charge transfer dynamics in photosynthetic reaction centers has a direct bearing on man's ability to develop light harvesting technology, while the excited state dynamics of DNA has implications in diseases such as skin cancer. Advances in femtosecond methods are crucial to the understanding of ultrafast phenomena in nature.

==== Photodissociation and femtosecond probing ====
Photodissociation is a chemical reaction in which a chemical compound is broken down by photons. It is defined as the interaction of one or more photons with one target molecule. Any photon with sufficient energy can affect the chemical bonds of a chemical compound, such as visible light, ultraviolet light, x-rays and gamma rays. The technique of probing chemical reactions has been successfully applied to unimolecular dissociations. The possibility of using a femtosecond technique to study bimolecular reactions at the individual collision level is complicated by the difficulties of spatial and temporal synchronization. One way to overcome this problem is through the use of Van der Waals complexes of weakly bound molecular cluster. Femtosecond techniques are not limited to the observation of the chemical reactions, but can even exploited to influence the course of the reaction. This can open new relaxation channels or increase the yield of certain reaction products.

== Picosecond-to-nanosecond spectroscopy ==
=== Streak camera ===
Unlike attosecond and femtosecond pulses, the duration of pulses on the nanosecond timescale are slow enough to be measured through electronic means. Streak cameras translate the temporal profile of pulses into that of a spatial profile; that is, photons that arrive on the detector at different times arrive at different locations on the detector.

=== Time-correlated single photon counting ===
Time-correlated single photon counting (TCSPC) is used to analyze the relaxation of molecules from an excited state to a lower energy state. Since various molecules in a sample will emit photons at different times following their simultaneous excitation, the decay must be thought of as having a certain rate rather than occurring at a specific time after excitation. The experimental setup is adjusted to detect 1 photon per 100 excitation pulses. In other words, less than one emitted photon is detected per laser pulse, and the process is repeated multiple times to get an average value. It measures the time difference between the excitation pulse and the photon detection, also called the time width (Δt). The fluorescence decay curve is obtained by plotting the measured time on the x-axis and the number of photons detected on the y-axis. However, it is difficult to simultaneously monitor multiple molecules. Instead, individual excitation-relaxation events are recorded and then averaged to generate the curve.

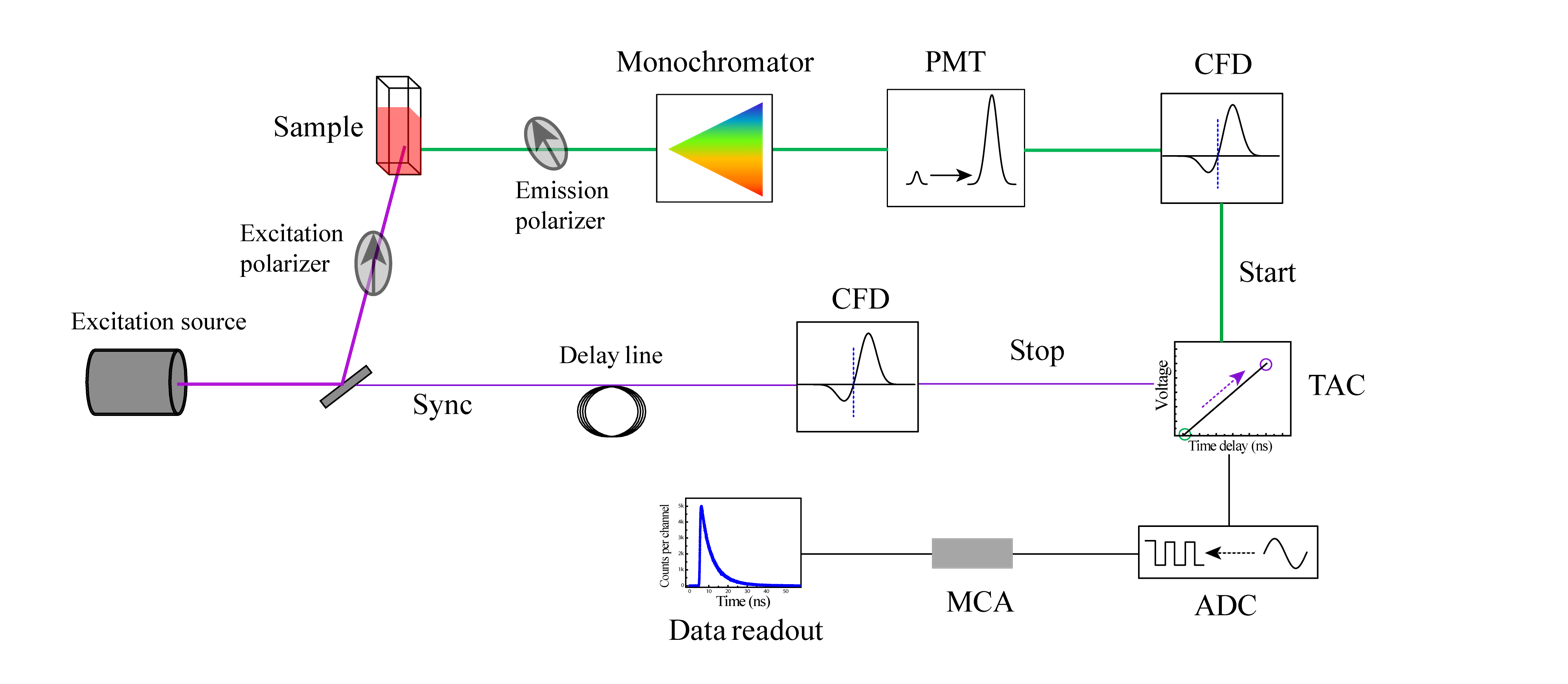
Schematic of a TCSPC setup

This technique analyzes the time difference between the excitation of the sample molecule and the release of energy as another photon. Repeating this process many times will give a decay profile. Pulsed lasers or LEDs can be used as a source of excitation. Part of the light passes through the sample, the other to the electronics as "sync" signal. The light emitted by the sample molecule is passed through a monochromator to select a specific wavelength. The light then is detected and amplified by a photomultiplier tube (PMT). The emitted light signal as well as reference light signal is processed through a constant fraction discriminator (CFD) which eliminates timing jitter. After passing through the CFD, the reference pulse activates a time-to-amplitude converter (TAC) circuit. The TAC charges a capacitor which will hold the signal until the next electrical pulse. In reverse TAC mode the signal of "sync" stops the TAC. This data is then further processed by an analog-to-digital converter (ADC) and multi-channel analyzer (MCA) to get a data output. To make sure that the decay is not biased to early arriving photons, the photon count rate is kept low (usually less than 1% of excitation rate).

This electrical pulse comes after the second laser pulse excites the molecule to a higher energy state, and a photon is eventually emitted from a single molecule upon returning to its original state. Thus, the longer a molecule takes to emit a photon, the higher the voltage of the resulting pulse. The central concept of this technique is that only a single photon is needed to discharge the capacitor. Thus, this experiment must be repeated many times to gather the full range of delays between excitation and emission of a photon. After each trial, a pre-calibrated computer converts the voltage sent out by the TAC into a time and records the event in a histogram of time since excitation. Since the probability that no molecule will have relaxed decreases with time, a decay curve emerges that can then be analyzed to find out the decay rate of the event.

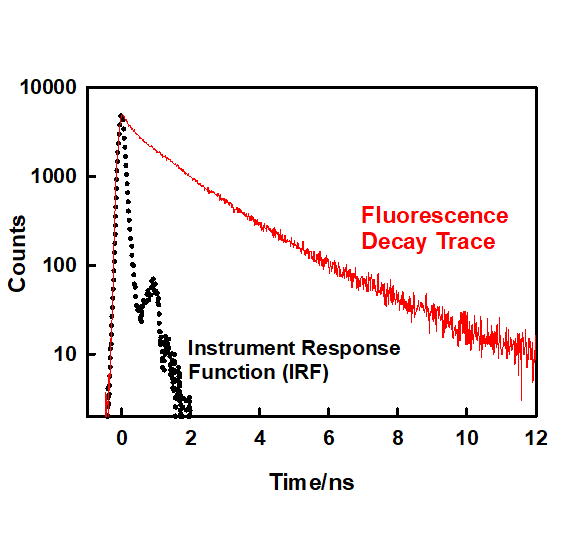
An example of a fluorescence lifetime decay trace, measured using Time-Correlated Single Photon Counting (TCSPC).

Three curves are associated with the observed decay intensity in a fluorescence decay experiment: the measured data, the instrument response function (IRF), and the calculated decay. The IRF, which represents the shortest time profile the instrument can detect, serves as a reference for accurately deconvolving the measured data. This allows for a more precise determination of the fluorescence decay time by accounting for the system's inherent response. As the term implies, this curve illustrates the response of the instrument to a sample with zero lifetime. Usually, dilute scattering solutions, such as Ludox (colloidal silica) and titanium dioxide are used to collect the curve. The measured intensity indicates the number of photons detected within a given time interval, while the calculated decay curve, also known as the fitted curve, represents the convolution of the IRF with the impulse response function.

A major complicating factor is that many decay processes involve multiple energy states, and thus multiple rate constants. Though non-linear least squares analysis can usually detect the different rate constants, determining the processes involved is often very difficult and requires the combination of multiple ultra-fast techniques. Even more complicating is the presence of inter-system crossing and other non-radiative processes in a molecule. A limiting factor of this technique is that it is limited to studying energy states that result in fluorescent decay. The technique can also be used to study relaxation of electrons from the conduction band to the valence band in semiconductors.

TCSPC has extensive applications in fluorescence spectroscopy, microscopy (FLIM), and optical tomography. Over the years, this technique has gained significant attention for studying the fluorescence decay of various classes of molecules, including the fluorescence decay of residues in biological systems. The modulation of the fluorescence of the biological sample provides a better understanding of the complex system. TCSPC is widely used to study the intensity decay of Green Fluorescent Proteins (GFP), Chlorophyll aggregates in hexane, single fluorescence amino acid-containing proteins, and dinucleotides (FAD). It is also used to study the bandwidth in semiconductors.

== See also ==
- Atomic spectral line
- Attosecond chronoscopy
- Electronic configuration
- Terahertz time-domain spectroscopy (THz-TDS)
- Time-resolved spectroscopy
