= Carlos Silva (Portuguese footballer) =

Portuguese footballer (1902–?)

Personal information
- Date of birth: 25 January 1902 (age 124)
- Place of birth: Portugal
- Position: Goalkeeper

Senior career*
Years	Team	Apps	(Gls)
- União Lisboa

International career
1929	Portugal	1	(0)
- * Club domestic league appearances and goals

Carlos Silva (born 25 January 1902) was a Portuguese footballer who played as a goalkeeper. He made one appearance for the Portugal national team, in a 6–1 defeat against Italy in Milan, Italy on 1 December 1929.
