= Paul Barbara =

American chemist

Paul Frank Barbara
- Born: April 24, 1953
- Died: October 31, 2010 (aged 57)
- Education: Hofstra University (B.A.), Brown University (Ph.D.)
- Spouse: Sharon Barbara
- Children: Juliet Barbara, Jason Barbara
- Scientific career
- Fields: Chemistry
- Workplaces: University of Texas at Austin, University of Minnesota
- Doctoral advisor: Ronald G. Lawler

Paul Frank Barbara (April 24, 1953 – October 31, 2010) was an American chemist. His research interests focused on the understanding of the molecular structure and dynamics of complex chemical systems, including organic semi-conductors for photovoltaic applications, proton and electron transfer reactions, the hydrated electron and intermediates in the reverse transcription mechanism of HIV-1. His laboratory developed and applied novel ultrafast and single molecule spectroscopies to study the complexity of these chemical system.

Paul Barbara was a full professor at the University of Texas at Austin. He held the R.J.V. Johnson-Welch Endowed Chair in the department of chemistry and biochemistry at UT-Austin. He was also Director of UT-Austin's Center for Nano- and Molecular Science and Technology, and Senior Editor for Accounts of Chemical Research.

== Education ==
Paul Barbara received his bachelor's degree in 1974 at Hofstra University and completed his doctoral work in 1978 at Brown University under the supervision of Ronald G. Lawler. From 1978 to 1980 he carried out postdoctoral work at Bell Laboratories with Peter M. Rentzepis and Louis E. Brus. He joined the faculty of the department of chemistry at the University of Minnesota in 1980, achieving the rank of full professor in 1990. He moved to the University of Texas at Austin in 1998, as full professor in the department of chemistry and biochemistry until his death.

== Awards ==
Paul Barbara was named 3M-Alumni Distinguished Professor of Chemistry in 1995, elected a Fellow of the American Academy of Arts and Sciences in 1999. a Fellow of the American Physical Society in 1993, a fellow of the American Association for Advancement of Science in 2004 and a member of the United States National Academy of Sciences in 2006. Other awards include an Alfred P. Sloan Fellowship in 1983–85, a Presidential Young Investigator Award in 1984–89, a NSF Creativity Award in 1998, Inter-American Photochemical Society Award in 2002 and the 2009 E. Bright Wilson Award in Spectroscopy in 2008 from The American Chemical Society. The Barbara research group is nicknamed the ‘Barbarians’.

== Death ==
Paul Barbara died on October 31, 2010, two weeks after a cardiac arrest sent him into a coma.

A memorial service was held on December 12, 2010, on UT campus to celebrate the life of Paul F. Barbara. He is survived by his wife Sharon, daughter Juliet and son Jason.

== Sources ==
- Profile of Paul Barbara-PNAS
- Paul F. Barbara's Group Homepage
- C&E News E. Bright Wilson Award In Spectroscopy in 2009
