= Elizabeth D. Getzoff =

American biochemist

Elizabeth Dickinson Getzoff is an American biochemist. She holds a joint appointment at Scripps Research Institute in California, as professor emeritus in immunology and Microbiology, as well as integrative structural and computational biology (ISCB)

== Education and career ==
Getzoff received her chemistry degree at Duke University in 1976, where she also completed her doctoral studies in biochemistry in 1982. In 1983 she became a faculty member of the Skaggs Institute for Chemical Biology and Professor in Molecular Biology at Scripps Research. In 2012 she was appointed professor in immunology and microbial science, in 2013 she was appointed professor in integrative structural and computational biology and in 2017 she was appointed professor in immunology and microbiology at Scripps Research.

== Research interest ==
Getzoff is currently leading a research group at the Scripps Research Institute. The main focus of her team is the characterization of protein conformational changes in cellular pathways, such as protein recognition, interaction and catalysis. In particular, they are interested in proteins involved in photosensing, in the enzymatic control of reactive oxygen and nitrogen species, in the coupling of metal-site chemistry and electron transfer for catalysis, and in protein networks involved in circadian rhythms. In their studies, they use multidisciplinary approaches that include high-resolution protein crystallography, computational and computer graphics analysis, protein design cycles, small angle X-ray scattering, biochemical and spectroscopic analyses, and further molecular biology techniques

== Publications ==
Getzoff has been cited over 25,000 times. Her most cited publications are

- Deng HX, Hentati A, Tainer JA, Iqbal Z, Cayabyab A, Hung WY, Getzoff ED, Hu P, Herzfeldt B, Roos RP. Amyotrophic lateral sclerosis and structural defects in Cu, Zn superoxide dismutase. Science. 1993 Aug 20;261(5124):1047-51. According to Google Scholar, it has been cited 1652 times.
- Tainer JA, Getzoff ED, Richardson JS, Richardson DC. Structure and mechanism of copper, zinc superoxide dismutase. Nature. 1983 Nov;306(5940):284-7. According to Google Scholar, this article has been cited 1044 times
- Tainer JA, Getzoff ED, Beem KM, Richardson JS, Richardson DC. Determination and analysis of the 2 Å structure of copper, zinc superoxide dismutase. Journal of Molecular Biology. 1982 Sep 15;160(2):181-217. According to Google Scholar, this article has been cited 1158 times
- Crane BR, Arvai AS, Ghosh DK, Wu C, Getzoff ED, Stuehr DJ, Tainer JA. Structure of nitric oxide synthase oxygenase dimer with pterin and substrate. Science. 1998 Mar 27;279(5359):2121-6. According to Google Scholar, this article has been cited 780 times
