= Time-resolved crystallography =

X-ray crystallographic technique

Pump-probe techniques to measure short time physics and time-resolved crystallography

Time-resolved crystallography uses X-ray crystallography imaging to visualize reactions in four dimensions (x, y, z, and time). This enables the studies of dynamical changes that occur in, for example, enzymes during their catalysis. The time dimension is incorporated by triggering the reaction of interest in the crystal prior to X-ray exposure, and then collecting the diffraction patterns at different time delays. In order to study these dynamical properties of macromolecules, three criteria must be met:

- The macromolecule must be biologically active in the crystalline state,
- It must be possible to trigger the reaction in the crystal, and
- The intermediate of interest must be detectable; that is, it must have a reasonable amount of concentration in the crystal (preferably over 25%).

This has led to the development of several techniques that can be divided into two groups, the pump-probe method and diffusion-trapping methods.

== Pump-probe ==
In the pump-probe method, the reaction is first triggered (pump) by photolysis (most often laser light), and then a diffraction pattern is collected by an X-ray pulse (probe) at a specific time delay. This makes it possible to obtain many images at different time delays after reaction triggering, and thereby building a chronological series of images describing the events during reaction. To obtain a reasonable signal-to-noise ratio, this pump-probe cycle has to be performed many times for each spatial rotation of the crystal, and many times for the same time delay. Therefore, the reaction that one wishes to study with pump-probe must be able to relax back to its original conformation after triggering, enabling many measurements on the same sample. The time resolution of the observed phenomena is dictated by the time width of the probing pulse (full width at half maximum). All processes that happen on a faster time scale than that are averaged out by the convolution of the probe pulse intensity in time with the intensity of the actual x-ray reflectivity of the sample.

== Diffusion-trapping ==
Diffusion-trapping methods use diffusion techniques to get the substrates into the crystal and thereafter different trapping techniques to get the intermediate of interest to accumulate in the crystal prior to collection of the diffraction pattern. These trapping methods could involve changes in pH or the use of an inhibitor or low temperature in order to slow down the turnover rate or maybe even stop the reaction completely at a specific step. Just starting the reaction and then flash-freezing it, thereby quenching it at a specific time step, is also a possible method. One drawback with diffusion-trapping methods is that they can only be used to study intermediates that can be trapped, thereby limiting the time resolution one can obtain through compared to the pump-probe method.

== See also ==
- Keith Moffat
