= Ipes =

IPES may refer to:

- Instituto de Pesquisas e Estudos Sociais, a Brazilian think tank of the 1960s
- Inverse photoemission spectroscopy
- Ipos, an Earl and powerful Prince of Hell in demonology
- Tabebuia, Ipê trees
- Lapacho, a medical tea
- Improved Proposed Encryption Standard
