= Electron spectroscopy =

Analytical technique in chemistry

Electron spectroscopy refers to a group formed by techniques based on the analysis of the energies of emitted electrons such as photoelectrons and Auger electrons. This group includes X-ray photoelectron spectroscopy (XPS), which also known as Electron Spectroscopy for Chemical Analysis (ESCA), Electron energy loss spectroscopy (EELS), Ultraviolet photoelectron spectroscopy (UPS), and Auger electron spectroscopy (AES). These analytical techniques are used to identify and determine the elements and their electronic structures from the surface of a test sample. Samples can be solids, gases or liquids.

Chemical information is obtained only from the uppermost atomic layers of the sample (depth 10 nm or less) because the energies of Auger electrons and photoelectrons are quite low, typically 20 - 2000 eV. For this reason, electron spectroscopy techniques are used to analyze surface chemicals.

== History ==
The development of electron spectroscopy can be considered to have begun in 1887 when the German physicist Heinrich Rudolf Hertz discovered the photoelectric effect but was unable to explain it. In 1900, Max Planck (1918 Nobel Prize in Physics) suggested that energy carried by electromagnetic waves could only be released in "packets" of energy. In 1905 Albert Einstein (1921 Nobel Prize of Physics) explained Planck's discovery and the photoelectric effect. He presented the hypothesis that light energy is carried in discrete quantized packets (photons), each with energy E=hν to explain the experimental observations. Two years after this publication, in 1907, P. D. Innes recorded the first XPS spectrum.

After numerous developments and the Second World War, Kai Siegbahn (Nobel Prize in 1981) with his research group in Uppsala, Sweden registered in 1954 the first XPS device to produce a high energy-resolution XPS spectrum. In 1967, Siegbahn published a comprehensive study of XPS and its usefulness, which he called electron spectroscopy for chemical analysis (ESCA). Concurrently with Siegbahn's work, in 1962, David W. Turner at Imperial College London (and later Oxford University) developed ultraviolet photoelectron spectroscopy (UPS) for molecular species using a helium lamp.

== Basic theory ==
In electron spectroscopy, depending on the technique, irradiating the sample with high-energy particles such as X-ray photons, electron beam electrons, or ultraviolet radiation photons, causes Auger electrons and photoelectrons to be emitted. Figure 1 illustrates this on the basis of a single event in which, for example, an incoming X-ray photon from a particular energy range (E=hv) transfers its energy to an electron in the inner shell of an atom. The absorption of this photon ejects the electron and leaves a hole in the atomic shell (see figure 1 (a)). The hole can be filled in two ways, forming different characteristic rays that are specific to each element. If an electron from a shell with a higher energy level jumps to fill the hole, the energy difference can be emitted as a fluorescent photon (figure 1 (b)). In the Auger phenomenon, when the electron jumps from the higher energy level, its energy instead causes an adjacent or nearby electron to be ejected, forming an Auger electron (figure 1 (c)).

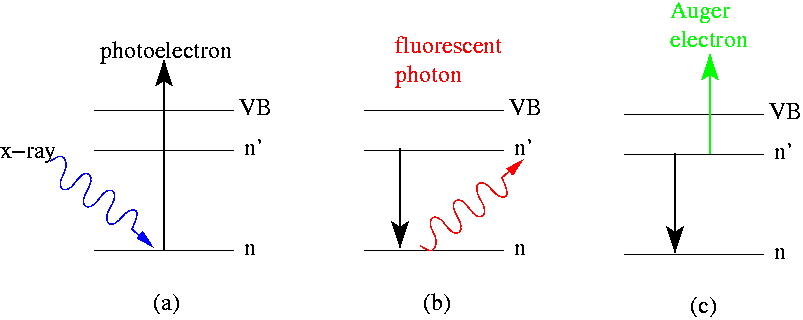
Figure 1. Formation of photoelectrons (a) followed by formation of fluorescence photons (b) or Auger electrons (c).

As can be seen from the discussion above and figure 1, Auger electrons and photoelectrons are different in their physical origin, however, both types of electrons carry similar information about the chemical elements in material surfaces. Each element has its own special Auger electron or photon electron energy from which these can be identified. The binding energy of a photoelectron can be calculated by the formula below.

$$E_\text{binding} = h\nu - E_\text{kinetic} - \phi$$

where E_{binding} is the binding energy of the photoelectron, hν is the energy of the incoming radiation particle, E_{kinetic} is the kinetic energy of the photoelectron measured by the device and $\phi$ is the work function.

The kinetic energy of the Auger electron is approximately equal to the energy difference between the binding energies of the electron shells involved in the Auger process. This can be calculated as follows:

$$E_\text{kinetic} = h\nu - E_\text{B} - E_\text{C}$$

where E_{kinetic} is the kinetic energy of the Auger electron, hν is the energy of the incoming radiation particle and E_{B} is first outer shell binding energy and E_{C} is second outer shell binding energies.

== Types of electron spectroscopy ==
- X-ray photoelectron spectroscopy
- Auger electron spectroscopy
- Electron energy loss spectroscopy
- Ultraviolet photoelectron spectroscopy
