= Universal curve =

The term universal curve is used:

- In the mathematical field of fractals and curves: Menger sponge
- To describe the Inelastic mean free path of electrons in solids.
- A universal object for the moduli of curves.
