= Chemical state =

The chemical state of a chemical element is due to its electronic, chemical and physical properties as it exists in combination with itself or a group of one or more other elements. A chemical state is often defined as an "oxidation state" when referring to metal cations. When referring to organic materials, a chemical state is usually defined as a chemical group, which is a group of several elements bonded together. Material scientists, solid state physicists, analytical chemists, surface scientists and spectroscopists describe or characterize the chemical, physical and/or electronic nature of the surface or the bulk regions of a material as having or existing as one or more chemical states.

== Overview ==
The chemical state set comprises and encompasses these subordinate groups and entities: chemical species, functional group, anion, cation, oxidation state, chemical compound and elemental forms of an element.

This term or phrase is commonly used when interpreting data from analytical techniques such as:

- Auger electron spectroscopy (AES)
- Energy-dispersive X-ray spectroscopy (EDS, EDX)
- Infrared spectroscopy (IR, FT-IR, ATR)
- Liquid chromatography (LC, HPLC)
- Mass spectrometry (MS, ToF-SIMS, D-SIMS)
- Nuclear magnetic resonance (NMR, H-NMR, C-NMR, X-NMR)
- Photoemission spectroscopy (PES, UPS)
- Raman spectroscopy (FT-Raman)
- Ultraviolet-visible spectroscopy (UV-Vis)
- X-ray photoelectron spectroscopy (XPS, ESCA)
- Wavelength dispersive X-ray spectroscopy (WDX, WDS)

== Significance ==
The chemical state of a group of elements, can be similar to, but not identical to, the chemical state of another similar group of elements because the two groups have different ratios of the same elements and exhibit different chemical, electronic, and physical properties that can be detected by various spectroscopic techniques.

A chemical state can exist on or inside the surface of a solid state material and can often, but not always, be isolated or separated from the other chemical species found on the surface of that material. Surface scientists, spectroscopists, chemical analysts, and material scientists frequently describe the chemical nature of the chemical species, functional group, anion, or cation detected on the surface and near the surface of a solid state material as its chemical state.

To understand how a chemical state differs from an oxidation state, anion, or cation, compare sodium fluoride (NaF) to polytetrafluoroethylene (PTFE, Teflon). Both contain fluorine, the most electronegative element, but only NaF dissolves in water to form separate ions, Na^{+} and F^{−}. The electronegativity of the fluorine strongly polarizes the electron density that exists between the carbon and the fluorine, but not enough to produce ions which would allow it to dissolve in the water. The carbon and fluorine in Teflon (PTFE) both have an electronic charge of zero since they form a covalent bond, but few scientists describe those elements as having an oxidation state of zero. On the other hand, many elements, in their pure form, are often described as existing with an oxidation state of zero. This is one of the attributes of nomenclature that has been upheld over the years.

== Closely related nomenclature ==
The chemical state of an element is often confused with its oxidation state. The chemical state of an element or a group of elements that has a non-zero ionic charge, e.g. (1+), (2+), (3+), (1-), (2-) (3-), is defined as the oxidation state of that element or group of elements. Elements or chemical groups that have an ionic charge can usually be dissolved to form ions in either water or another polar solvent. Such a compound or salt is described as an ionic compound with ionic bonds which means that, in effect, all of the electron density of one or more valence electrons has been transferred from the less electronegative group of elements to the more electronegative group of elements. In the case of a non-ionic compound the chemical bonds are non-ionic such meaning the compound will probably not dissolve in water or another polar solvent. Many non-ionic compounds have chemical bonds that share the electron density that binds them together. This type of chemical bond is either a non-polar covalent bond or a polar covalent bond.

A functional group is very similar to a chemical species and a chemical group. A chemical group or chemical species exhibits a distinctive reaction behavior or a distinctive spectral signal when analyzed by various spectroscopic methods. These three groupings are often used to describe the groups of elements that exist within an organic molecule.

== Examples of chemical names that describe the chemical state of a group of elements ==
The following list of neutral compounds, anions, cations, functional groups and chemical species is a partial list of the many groups of elements that can exhibit or have a unique "chemical state" while being part of the surface or the bulk of a solid state material.

- Metal oxide
- Metal hydroxide
- Metal carbonate
- Inorganic carbonate
- Fluoro-ether
- Organofluoride
- Organic type chlorine
- Inorganic type chlorine
- Trifluoromethyl
- Difluoromethyl
- Benzyl group
- Phenyl group
- Carbonyl bond
- Ether Group
- Alcohol bond
- Organic acid
- Double bond
- Triple bond
- Inorganic acid
- Organic ester
- Metal ester
- Organic carbonate
- Nitrile group
- Cyanide ion
- Perchlorate ion
- Sodium ion
- Lithium ion
- Magnesium ion
- Calcium ion
- Lead ion
- Sulfate ion
- Phosphate ion
- Silicate group
- Stannate group
- Halide ion
- Fluoride ion
- Chloride ion
- Bromide ion
- Iodide ion
- Chalcogenide group
- Sulfide group
- Halide group
- Metal sulfide
- Organic sulfide
- Metal selenide
- Telluride
- Nitride
- Nitrite ion
- Nitrate ion
- Phosphide
- Arsenide
- Antimonide
- Silicide
- Silicate
- Gallate
- Germanate
- Tungstate
- Niobate
- Ferric ion
- Ferrous ion
- Ferride
- Ferrate
- Rhenate
- Mercurous
- Mercuric ion
- Mercurate
- Thallate
- Thallic ion

== See also ==
- X-ray photoelectron spectroscopy
- Photoemission spectroscopy
