= Stefan Hüfner =

German physicist (1935–2013)

- Born: July 2, 1935; Löwenberg, Silesia, Poland
- Died: January 17, 2013 (aged 77); Saarbrücken, Saarland, Germany
- Education: University of Frankfurt; Technical University of Darmstadt
- Known for: Photoemission spectroscopy
- Scientific career
- Institutions: Technical University of Darmstadt; Bell Labs; Free University of Berlin; Saarland University
- Doctoral advisor: Karl-Heinz Hellwege
- Doctoral students: Peter Grünberg; Michael Loewenhaupt

Stefan Hüfner (July 2, 1935, in Löwenberg, Silesia – January 17, 2013, in Saarbrücken, Saarland) was a German experimental physicist specialized in solid-state physics and photoemission spectroscopy.

== Education and career ==
Hüfner studied mathematics and physics at the Goethe University of Frankfurt and the Technical University of Darmstadt. After graduating from 1960 to 1966, he was a scientific assistant at the Institute for Technical Physics at the TU Darmstadt. In 1963 he received his doctorate there, supervised by Karl-Heinz Hellwege. In 1966 he obtained habilitation in physics. He was a guest researcher at the Technical University of Munich and at the Bell Telephone Laboratories in Murray Hill, New Jersey, USA. From 1967 to 1968 he was a privatdozent at the TU Darmstadt and the doctoral supervisor of Peter Grünberg, who was awarded the Nobel Prize in Physics in 2007.

In 1968 he received a call to the professorship for experimental physics at the Free University of Berlin as the successor to Professor Gerhard Simonsohn. In 1975, Hüfner moved to the professorship for experimental physics at Saarland University. In 1994 he became founding speaker of the Collaborative Research Center "Interface-determined Materials". In 2001 he took over the office of university vice president for planning and strategy, which he held until the beginning of 2003. In September 2003 he retired.

== Honors and awards ==
Hüfner was an emeritus member of the advisory board of the Max Planck Institute for Nuclear Physics in Heidelberg, the Max Planck Institute for Physics in Munich, the Max Planck Institute for Plasma Physics in Greifswald and Munich and the Max Planck Institute for Quantum Optics in Munich and other advisory boards of the Max Planck Society. Since 2004 he has been a member and chairman of the Technical Committee for Engineering Sciences of the Elite Network of Bavaria. In 2006/2007 he was a visiting professor at the University of British Columbia in Vancouver, Canada.

He received honorary doctorates from the University of Fribourg and the Free University of Berlin.

== Works ==
Hüfner authored the classic textbook on photoemission spectroscopy, first published in 1995 and has gone through three editions in total.

In addition to numerous scientific publications, Hüfner has also written several novels, including Der Tote von Dresden (Conte Verlag 2004, ISBN 978-3-936950-49-6) and Artikel eins. Ein Zukunftsroman (Conte Verlag 2006, ISBN 978-3-936950-41-0).

== Bibliography ==
=== Textbooks and monographs ===
- Hüfner, Stefan (1978). Optical spectra of transparent rare earth compounds. New York: Academic Press. ISBN 0-12-360450-8. OCLC 3870316.
- Hüfner, Stefan (1988). Der Physiker und sein Experiment aus d. Leben e. ausserordentl. Professors (in German). Konstanz: Universitätsverlag Konstanz. ISBN 978-3-87940-327-1. OCLC 310893693.
- Hüfner, Stefan (2003). Photoelectron spectroscopy: principles and applications (3rd ed.). Berlin: Springer. ISBN 3-540-41802-4. OCLC 50920762.
- Hüfner, Stefan (2007). Very high resolution photoelectron spectroscopy. Berlin: Springer. ISBN 978-3-540-68133-5. OCLC 185026983.

=== Fictions ===
- Hüfner, Stefan (2004). Der Tote von Dresden (in German). Saarbrücken: Conte Verlag. ISBN 978-3-936950-13-7. OCLC 76651414.
- Hüfner, Stefan (2006). Artikel eins: ein Zukunftsroman (in German). Saarbrücken: Conte Verlag. ISBN 978-3-936950-41-0. OCLC 181541387.
- Hüfner, Stefan (2009). Die Frauen des Physikers: Roman (in German). Merzig: Gollenstein Verlag. ISBN 978-3-938823-48-4. OCLC 318215192.

=== Reviews ===
- Hüfner, S. (1978). "ESCA as a method of surface analysis". Fresenius' Zeitschrift für analytische Chemie. 291 (2): 97–107. doi:10.1007/BF00482546. ISSN 0016-1152. S2CID 100660630.
- Steiner, P.; Höchst, H.; Hüfner, S. (1978). "XPS investigation of simple metals: I. Core Level Spectra". Zeitschrift für Physik B: Condensed Matter. 30 (2): 129–143. doi:10.1007/BF01320978. ISSN 0340-224X. S2CID 118960412.
- Höchst, H.; Steiner, P.; Hüfner, S. (1978). "XPS investigation of simple metals: II. The Valence Band Spectra". Zeitschrift für Physik B: Condensed Matter. 30 (2): 145–154. doi:10.1007/BF01320979. ISSN 0340-224X. S2CID 103886129.
- Hüfner, S. (1979), "Unfilled inner shells: Transition metals and compounds", in Ley, Lothar; Cardona, Manuel (eds.), Photoemission in Solids II, Topics in Applied Physics, vol. 27, Berlin, Heidelberg: Springer Berlin Heidelberg, pp. 173–216, Bibcode:1979ps2..book..173H, doi:10.1007/3-540-09202-1_3, ISBN 978-3-540-09202-5
- Hüfner, S. (1981). "Photoemissionsspektroskopie in Chemie und Physik". Naturwissenschaften (in German). 68 (7): 360–370. Bibcode:1981NW.....68..360H. doi:10.1007/BF01058025. ISSN 0028-1042. S2CID 20553967.
- Courths, R; Cord, B; Wern, H; Hüfner, S (1983-01-01). "Angle-Resolved Photoemission and Band Structure of Copper". Physica Scripta. T4: 144–147. Bibcode:1983PhST....4..144C. doi:10.1088/0031-8949/1983/T4/031. ISSN 0031-8949. S2CID 250819340.
- Courths, R.; Hüfner, S. (1984). "Photoemission experiments on copper". Physics Reports. 112 (2): 53–171. Bibcode:1984PhR...112...53C. doi:10.1016/0370-1573(84)90167-4.
- Hüfner, S. (1987), "Chapter 67 Photoemission in chalcogenides", High Energy Spectroscopy, Handbook on the Physics and Chemistry of Rare Earths, vol. 10, Elsevier, pp. 301–319, doi:10.1016/s0168-1273(87)10009-8, ISBN 978-0-444-87063-6
- Hüfner, S. (1994). "Electronic structure of NiO and related 3d-transition-metal compounds". Advances in Physics. 43 (2): 183–356. Bibcode:1994AdPhy..43..183H. doi:10.1080/00018739400101495. ISSN 0001-8732.
- Hüfner, S; Claessen, R; Reinert, F; Straub, Th; Strocov, V.N; Steiner, P (1999). "Photoemission spectroscopy in metals". Journal of Electron Spectroscopy and Related Phenomena. 100 (1–3): 191–213. doi:10.1016/S0368-2048(99)00047-X.
- Reinert, Friedrich; Hüfner, Stefan (2005-04-29). "Photoemission spectroscopy—from early days to recent applications". New Journal of Physics. 7 (1): 97. Bibcode:2005NJPh....7...97R. doi:10.1088/1367-2630/7/1/097. ISSN 1367-2630. S2CID 122195562.
- Hüfner, Stefan; Schmidt, Stefan; Reinert, Friedrich (2005-07-21). "Photoelectron spectroscopy—An overview". Nuclear Instruments and Methods in Physics Research Section A: Accelerators, Spectrometers, Detectors and Associated Equipment. 547 (1): 8–23. Bibcode:2005NIMPA.547....8H. doi:10.1016/j.nima.2005.05.008.
- Hüfner, Stefan; Reinert, Friedrich; Schmidt, Stefan; Nicolay, Georg; Forster, Frank (2008), "Photoemission Investigation of the L̄ -Gap Surface States on Clean and Rare Gas-Covered Noble Metal (111)-Surfaces", in Hempelmann, Rolf; Baumgärtel, Helmut (eds.), Progress in Physical Chemistry Volume 2, Oldenbourg Verlag, pp. 183–207, doi:10.1524/9783486598674.183, ISBN 978-3-486-58629-9
- Hüfner, S; Hossain, M A; Damascelli, A; Sawatzky, G A (2008-06-01). "Two gaps make a high-temperature superconductor?". Reports on Progress in Physics. 71 (6) 062501. arXiv:0706.4282. Bibcode:2008RPPh...71f2501H. doi:10.1088/0034-4885/71/6/062501. ISSN 0034-4885. S2CID 55470102.

== See also ==
- Jürgen Kirschner
