= Photoemission spectroscopy =

Examining a substance by measuring electrons emitted in the photoelectric effect

Principle of angle-resolved photoemission spectroscopy.

Photoemission spectroscopy (PES), also known as photoelectron spectroscopy, refers to energy or spin measurement of electrons emitted from solids, gases or liquids by the photoelectric effect, in order to determine the binding energies or magnetic properties of electrons in the substance. The term refers to various techniques, depending on whether the ionization energy is provided by X-ray, EUV or UV photons. Regardless of the incident photon beam, however, all photoelectron spectroscopy revolves around the general theme of surface analysis by measuring the ejected electrons.

== Types ==
X-ray photoelectron spectroscopy (XPS) was developed by Kai Siegbahn starting in 1957 and is used to study the energy levels of atomic core electrons, primarily in solids. Siegbahn referred to the technique as "electron spectroscopy for chemical analysis" (ESCA), since the core levels have small chemical shifts depending on the chemical environment of the atom that is ionized, allowing chemical structure to be determined. Siegbahn was awarded the Nobel Prize in 1981 for this work. XPS is sometimes referred to as PESIS (photoelectron spectroscopy for inner shells), whereas the lower-energy radiation of UV light is referred to as PESOS (outer shells) because it cannot excite core electrons.

Ultraviolet photoelectron spectroscopy (UPS) is used to study valence energy levels and chemical bonding, especially the bonding character of molecular orbitals. The method was developed originally for gas-phase molecules in 1961 by Feodor I. Vilesov and in 1962 by David W. Turner, and other early workers included David C. Frost, J. H. D. Eland and K. Kimura. Later, Richard Smalley modified the technique and used a UV laser to excite the sample, in order to measure the binding energy of electrons in gaseous molecular clusters.

Angle-resolved photoemission spectroscopy (ARPES) has become the most prevalent electron spectroscopy in condensed matter physics after recent advances in energy and momentum resolution, and widespread availability of synchrotron light sources. The technique is used to map the band structure of crystalline solids, to study quasiparticle dynamics in highly correlated materials, and to measure electron spin polarization.

Two-photon photoelectron spectroscopy (2PPE) extends the technique to optically excited electronic states through the introduction of a pump-and-probe scheme.

Extreme-ultraviolet photoelectron spectroscopy (EUPS) lies in between XPS and UPS. It is typically used to assess the valence band structure. Compared to XPS, it gives better energy resolution, and compared to UPS, the ejected electrons are faster, resulting in less space charge and mitigated final state effects.

== Physical principle ==
The physics behind the PES technique is an application of the photoelectric effect. The sample is exposed to a beam of UV or XUV light inducing photoelectric ionization. The energies of the emitted photoelectrons are characteristic of their original electronic states, and depend also on vibrational state and rotational level. For solids, photoelectrons can escape only from a depth on the order of nanometers, so that it is the surface layer which is analyzed.

Because of the high frequency of the light, and the substantial charge and energy of emitted electrons, photoemission is one of the most sensitive and accurate techniques for measuring the energies and shapes of electronic states and molecular and atomic orbitals. Photoemission is also among the most sensitive methods of detecting substances in trace concentrations, provided the sample is compatible with ultra-high vacuum and the analyte can be distinguished from background.

Typical PES (UPS) instruments use helium gas sources of UV light, with photon energy up to 52 eV (corresponding to wavelength 23.7 nm). The photoelectrons that actually escaped into the vacuum are collected, slightly slowed down, energy resolved, and counted. This results in a spectrum of electron intensity as a function of the measured kinetic energy. Because binding energy values are more readily applied and understood, the kinetic energy values, which are source dependent, are converted into binding energy values, which are source independent. This is achieved by applying Einstein's relation $E_k=h\nu-E_B$. The $h\nu$ term of this equation is the energy of the UV light quanta that are used for photoexcitation. Photoemission spectra are also measured using tunable synchrotron radiation sources.

The binding energies of the measured electrons are characteristic of the chemical structure and molecular bonding of the material. By adding a source monochromator and increasing the energy resolution of the electron analyzer, peaks appear with full width at half maximum (FWHM) less than 5–8 meV.

== See also ==
- Angle resolved photoemission spectroscopy (ARPES)
- Inverse photoemission spectroscopy (IPS)
- Rydberg ionization spectroscopy, including zero electron kinetic energy spectroscopy (ZEKE)
- Two-photon photoelectron spectroscopy (2PPE)
- Ultra-high vacuum (UHV)
- Ultraviolet photoelectron spectroscopy (UPS)
- Vibronic spectroscopy
- X-ray photoelectron spectroscopy (XPS)
- Stefan Hüfner
- William E. Spicer
