= Jürgen Kirschner =

German solid state physicist (born 1945)

Jürgen Kirschner (born 18 April 1945) is a German solid state physicist and a director at the Max Planck Institute of Microstructure Physics. Kirschner is known for his research in electron spectroscopy, including instrument development and the study of magnetic materials.

== Education and career ==
Kirschner was born in Arendsee (Altmark) and studied physics at Technical University of Munich, where he obtained his PhD in 1974. He followed with research position at Forschungszentrum Jülich and obtained his habilitation at RWTH Aachen University in 1982. From 1988 to 1991, he was a professor in experimental physics at the Free University of Berlin. From 1992 to 2015, he was at the Max Planck Institute of Microstructure Physics in Halle, where he also became a professor at the University of Halle since 1993. He retired in 2015.

== Honors and awards ==
Kirschner is a member of the German National Academy of Sciences Leopoldina since 2002. He has led several programs from the German Research Foundation.

== Bibliography ==
- Kirschner, J. (1977), "Electron-Excited Core Level Spectroscopies", in Ibach, Harald (ed.), Electron Spectroscopy for Surface Analysis, Topics in Current Physics, vol. 4, Berlin, Heidelberg: Springer Berlin Heidelberg, pp. 59–115, doi:10.1007/978-3-642-81099-2_3, ISBN 978-3-642-81101-2
- Kirschner, J. (1985). Polarized Electrons at Surfaces. Springer Tracts in Modern Physics. Vol. 106. Berlin, Heidelberg: Springer Berlin Heidelberg. doi:10.1007/bfb0108668. ISBN 978-3-540-15003-9.
- Berakdar, J.; Kirschner, J., eds. (2001). Many-Particle Spectroscopy of Atoms, Molecules, Clusters, and Surfaces. Boston, MA: Springer US. doi:10.1007/978-1-4615-1311-7. ISBN 978-1-4613-5491-8.
- Berakdar, J.; Kirschner, J., eds. (2004). Correlation spectroscopy of surfaces, thin films, and nanostructures. Weinheim: Wiley-VCH. ISBN 3-527-40477-5. OCLC 85820389.
