= Inverse photoemission spectroscopy =

Inverse photoemission spectroscopy (IPES) is a surface science technique used to study the unoccupied electronic structure of surfaces, thin films, and adsorbates. A well-collimated beam of electrons of a well defined energy (< 20 eV) is directed at the sample. These electrons couple to high-lying unoccupied electronic states and decay to low-lying unoccupied states, with a subset of these transitions being radiative. The photons emitted in the decay process are detected and an energy spectrum, photon counts vs. incident electron energy, is generated. Due to the low energy of the incident electrons, their penetration depth is only a few atomic layers, making inverse photoemission a particularly surface sensitive technique. As inverse photoemission probes the electronic states above the Fermi level of the system, it is a complementary technique to photoemission spectroscopy.

== Theory ==
The energy of photons ($h\nu$, where $h$ is the Planck constant) emitted when electrons incident on a substance using an electron beam with a constant energy ($E_i$) relax to a lower energy unoccupied state ($E_f$) is given by the conservation of energy as:

$$E_i=E_f+h\nu\,$$

By measuring $E_i$ and $h\nu$, the unoccupied state ($E_f$) of the surface can be found.

== Modes ==
Two modes can be used for this measurement. One is the isochromat mode, which scans the incident electron energy and keeps the detected photon energy constant. The other is the tunable photon energy mode, or spectrograph mode, which keeps the incident electron energy constant and measures the distribution of the detected photon energy. The latter can also measure the resonant inverse photoemission spectroscopy.

=== Isochromat mode ===
In isochromat mode, the incident electron energy is ramped and the emitted photons are detected at a fixed energy that is determined by the photon detector. Typically, an I_{2} gas filled Geiger–Müller tube with an entrance window of either SrF_{2} or CaF_{2} is used as the photon detector. The combination of window and filling gas determines the detected photon energy, and for I_{2} gas and either a SrF_{2} or CaF_{2} window, the photons energies are ~ 9.5 eV and ~ 9.7 eV, respectively.

=== Spectrograph mode ===
In spectrograph mode, the energy of the incident electron remains fixed and a grating spectrometer is used to the detect the emitted photons over a range of photon energies. A diffraction grating is used to disperse the emitted photons that are in turn detected with a two-dimensional position sensitive detector.

=== Comparison of modes ===
One advantage of spectrograph mode is the ability to acquire IPES spectra over a wide range of photon energies simultaneously. Additionally, the incident electron energy remains fixed which allows better focusing of the electron beam on the sample. Furthermore, by changing the incident electron energy the electronic structure can be studied in great detail. Although the grating spectrometer is very stable over time, the set-up can be very complex and its maintenance can be very expensive. The advantages of isochromat mode are its low cost, simple design and higher count rates.

== See also ==
- X-ray photoelectron spectroscopy
- Photoelectric effect
