= Howard Vollum Award =

The Howard Vollum Award for Distinguished Accomplishment in Science and Technology is an annual award that was created by Reed College and endowed in 1975 by a grant from the Millicent Foundation, now a part of the M.J. Murdock Charitable Trust.

The award was created as a tribute to the late C. Howard Vollum, a 1936 Reed graduate and lifelong friend of the college. For his senior thesis project, Vollum built an oscilloscope; he later went on to co-found Tektronix, which revolutionized oscilloscope design and became a world leader in test, measurement, and monitoring technology. The award "recognizes and celebrates the exceptional achievement of one or more members of the scientific and technical community of the Northwest." Winners are selected for "the perseverance, creative imagination, ability to work with people, and fresh approach to problem solving that characterized Howard Vollum's career." Past recipients include Steve Jobs, Bill Gates, and Leroy Hood.

== Recipients ==
- 2022 – Kevan M. Shokat
- 2018 – Mary Ruckelshaus
- 2017 – Geraldine (Geri) Richmond
- 2015 – Mary-Claire King
- 2014 – Ivan E. Sutherland
- 2013 – Kip S. Thorne
- 2012 – Edward D. Lazowska
- 2011 – Lynn M. Riddiford
- 2010 – Brian Druker
- 2009 – Carl E. Wieman
- 2008 – B. Kenneth Koe
- 2007 – Stanley Fields
- 2006 – Daniel Bump
- 2005 – Linus Torvalds
- 2004 – Warren M. Washington
- 2003 – Leroy Hood
- 2002 – Kenneth Raymond
- 2000 – James T. Russell
- 1999 – Jane Lubchenco
- 1997 – Russell J. Donnelly
- 1996 – Edwin G. Krebs
- 1995 – Adele Goldberg
- 1994 – Brian W. Matthews
- 1993 – Lynwood W. Swanson
- 1992 – Jerry F. Franklin
- 1991 – Steve Jobs
- 1990 – Lewis H. Kleinholz
- 1989 – Michael L. Posner
- 1988 – Harold K. Lonsdale
- 1987 – Gertrude F. Rempfer
- 1986 – David Powell Shoemaker
- 1985 – Howard S. Mason
- 1984 – Bill Gates and George Streisinger
- 1983 – Paul Lutus
- 1982 – Victor Klee
- 1981 – M. Lowell Edwards and Albert Starr
- 1980 – Paul H. Emmett
- 1979 – Linus C. Pauling
- 1978 – C. Norman Winningstad
- 1977 – Arthur F. Scott
- 1976 – John M. Fluke
- 1975 – Douglas C. Strain
