= Gertrude F. Rempfer =

American female scientist

Gertrude Fleming Rempfer
- Born: January 30, 1912; Seattle, Washington
- Died: October 4, 2011 (aged 99)
- Education: University of Washington (BA & PhD)
- Known for: Electron microscopy Civil rights advocacy
- Spouse: Robert Rempfer
- Children: 5
- Awards: Howard Vollum Award; Distinguished Scientist of the Electron Microscopy Society
- Scientific career
- Fields: Physics
- Workplaces: Portland State University
- Thesis: The Energy Losses Attending Thermionic and Field; Emission of Electrons from Metals (1939)
- Doctoral advisors: J.E. Henderson

Gertrude F. Rempfer (January 30, 1912 – October 4, 2011) was an American physicist notable for her innovations in electron microscopy and who also was a civil rights activist. In particular, she made innovations in instrumentation that resulted in significant improvements in the capability of electron microscopes.

Rempfer's innovations in electron microscopy extended to both transmission electron microscopy and photoemission electron microscopy. Her contributions included the design and improvement of the instrumentation, the actual instrument construction, and the application of electron microscopy in fields such as surface science, solid state physics, and biology. Rempfer was a university professor and at times worked in private industry and for the Manhattan Project.

== Early life and education ==
Rempfer grew up in Seattle, Washington. She enrolled at the University of Washington, initially majoring in forestry. As a woman, she was not allowed in forestry camps, a type of field experience required for the forestry major, and she therefore switched her major to physics for which she earned a BA degree in 1934. Rempfer remained at the University of Washington to complete her PhD in 1939. Her doctoral thesis advisor was Professor J.E. Henderson, and her thesis topic was The Energy Losses Attending Thermionic and Field Emission of Electrons from Metals, a suitable background for research in the field of microscopy.

== Scientific career ==
=== Early career ===
Following completion of her doctoral dissertation, Rempfer served as a physics instructor for one year at Mount Holyoke College and then for two years at Russell Sage College. In 1942, Rempfer became a part of the Manhattan Project as a physicist, first at the United States Naval Research Laboratory and then at the Special Alloy Materials Laboratories, which was housed at Columbia University.

From 1945 to 1951, Rempfer was employed by the Farrand Optical Company where she had a lead role in the design and construction of a new type of transmission electron microscope. The construction of this instrument was complete in 1947, with a capability of 15 angstroms resolution. The instrument was featured on the cover of the January 1949 issue of the Journal of Applied Physics. During her time at the Farrand Optical Company, Rempfer worked with Reinhold Rüdenberg who was an early pioneer in electron microscopy.

=== Academic appointments ===
Beginning in 1951, Rempfer with her husband Robert Rempfer held a series of faculty positions at colleges and universities. Rempfer was an associate professor of engineering at Antioch College, while her husband was on the mathematics faculty at the same institution. There were considerable attacks on academic freedom stemming from the anti-communist fervor of the times, which were at odds with the stated positions of the Rempfers favoring civil liberties. The resulting conflict at Antioch College necessitated that the Rempfers move on to faculty positions at Fisk University beginning in 1953. However, the faculty appointments of the Rempfers at Fisk University likewise became untenable because of the positions of the Rempfers favoring racial integration. (Note: Rempfer and her husband attempted to enroll their children in a nearby historically African-American public school.) As a result, they moved on to faculty positions at Pacific University in 1957 before settling at Portland State University where they remained for the duration of their academic careers.

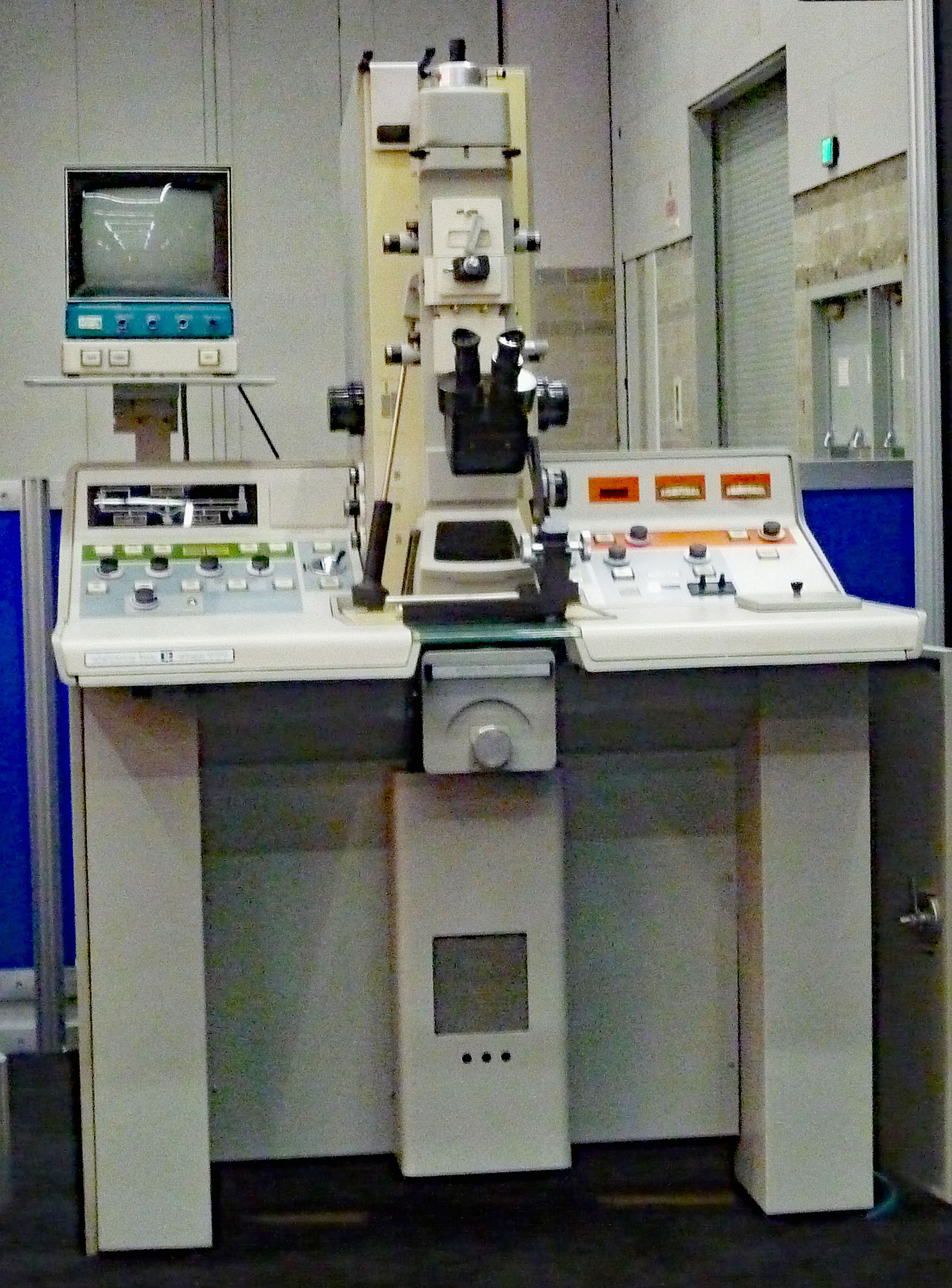
ETEM 101 Transmission Electron Microscope designed by Rempfer

In the 1960s while a faculty member at Portland State University, Rempfer worked closely with personnel at the Tektronix Corporation, a major oscilloscope manufacturer based nearby in Oregon, to build a novel transmission electron microscope that was unique in its simplicity of installation and use. Previous electron microscopes required complicated set-up and assembly, and the developers' belief at the time was that the simple operation of the new electron microscope would allow it to be used extensively in colleges and universities, as well as by scientific investigators in the developing world. Tektronix canceled the project late in development because of concerns over an inability of the company to market such a product. Following the cancellation by Tektronix, the microscope development was spun off to a start-up company known as Electros. Forty of the devices were built, which were known as the Elektros ETEM 101. Later, Electros went out of business due to an economic downturn. Rempfer then took possession of several of the instruments, distributing some to colleagues and keeping others for her own research. At least two of these electron microscopes are presently museum pieces, one being at the Tektronix Museum, having been donated by Rempfer's heirs.

Electron microscopes had limitations in resolution due to chromatic aberrations and spherical aberrations. In collaboration with an interdisciplinary team at the University of Oregon, Rempfer invented an electron mirror that corrected resolution limitations due to aberrations, thereby much improving the resolution of electron microscopes.

Rempfer had a long-standing collaboration with biologist O. Hayes Griffith who was on the faculty at the University of Oregon. The two explored the use of photoemission electron microscopy to biological systems, the technique having the advantages of minimal sample size, minimal sample damage, and high contrast between various biological structures. The advantages are a consequence of the high surface sensitivity of photoemission electron microscopy. Rempfer and Griffith developed applications of the microscopy technique to DNA and to biological cell structures, achieving a resolution of up to 8 nanometers. The collaboration resulted in several publications in academic journals.

=== Emeritus years ===
Rempfer officially retired from the Portland State University faculty in 1977 in accord with the university's mandatory retirement policy. However, she remained at the university as an emeritus professor where she continued to conduct scientific research nearly until the time of her death. Her last doctoral student completed their degree in 2009.

Rempfer published 36 peer-reviewed scientific journal articles and was an inventor on five United States Patents during the entirety of her career.

== Personal life ==
While teaching at Mount Holyoke College in Troy, New York, Rempfer (then known as Gertrude Fleming) met Robert Rempfer, who was a professor of mathematics at nearby Rennselaer Polytechnic Institute. The two of them subsequently married, eventually having five children together.

During her career at Portland State University, Rempfer lived on an 8 acres (3.2 ha) farm in Forest Grove, Oregon, with her husband Robert Rempfer and their five children. Robert Rempfer was a professor of mathematics at Portland State University.

Rempfer was often known as "Gert" to friends and close colleagues.

At a ceremony honoring her at Reed College, Rempfer made a statement directed at young women about careers in science and womanhood:

"To me it is no mystery why there are not more women in leadership positions in science. It has been mentioned that I am the first woman to receive the Howard Vollum Award, and of course I am very proud to be chosen. But when it is no longer considered unusual for a woman to be so honored or to achieve a position of leadership in public life, then we women will know that we have made it."

== Honors and recognition ==
In 1987 Rempfer became the first woman to receive the Howard Vollum Award for Distinguished Accomplishment in Science and Technology, presented at Reed College.

The Electron Microscopy Society of America presented Rempfer with its Distinguished Scientist Award of 1990.

Ohio University awarded Rempfer an honorary doctorate of science in 1992 for her scientific accomplishments while recognizing the circumstances under which she left Antioch College. Fisk University presented Rempfer with a certificate of service at its 1996 Freedom Day Convocation, which was a recognition of her stance on racial integration at the time she was a faculty member there. The award certificate from Fisk University stated: "One Concerned for the Greater Good of Humankind."

In 1997 Portland State University established an endowed chairmanship named after Rempfer. Rempfer's name was enshrined on the "Walk of the Heroines" at Portland State University.

Rempfer was named a Fellow of the Microscopy Society of America in 2009.

In 2012, the scientific journal Ultramicroscopy published an issue posthumously honoring the scientific achievements of Rempfer.

In 2017 Vanderbilt University athletics posthumously honored Rempfer and her husband Robert Rempfer for their civil rights efforts while they were faculty members at nearby Fisk University.

== Representative journal articles and patents ==
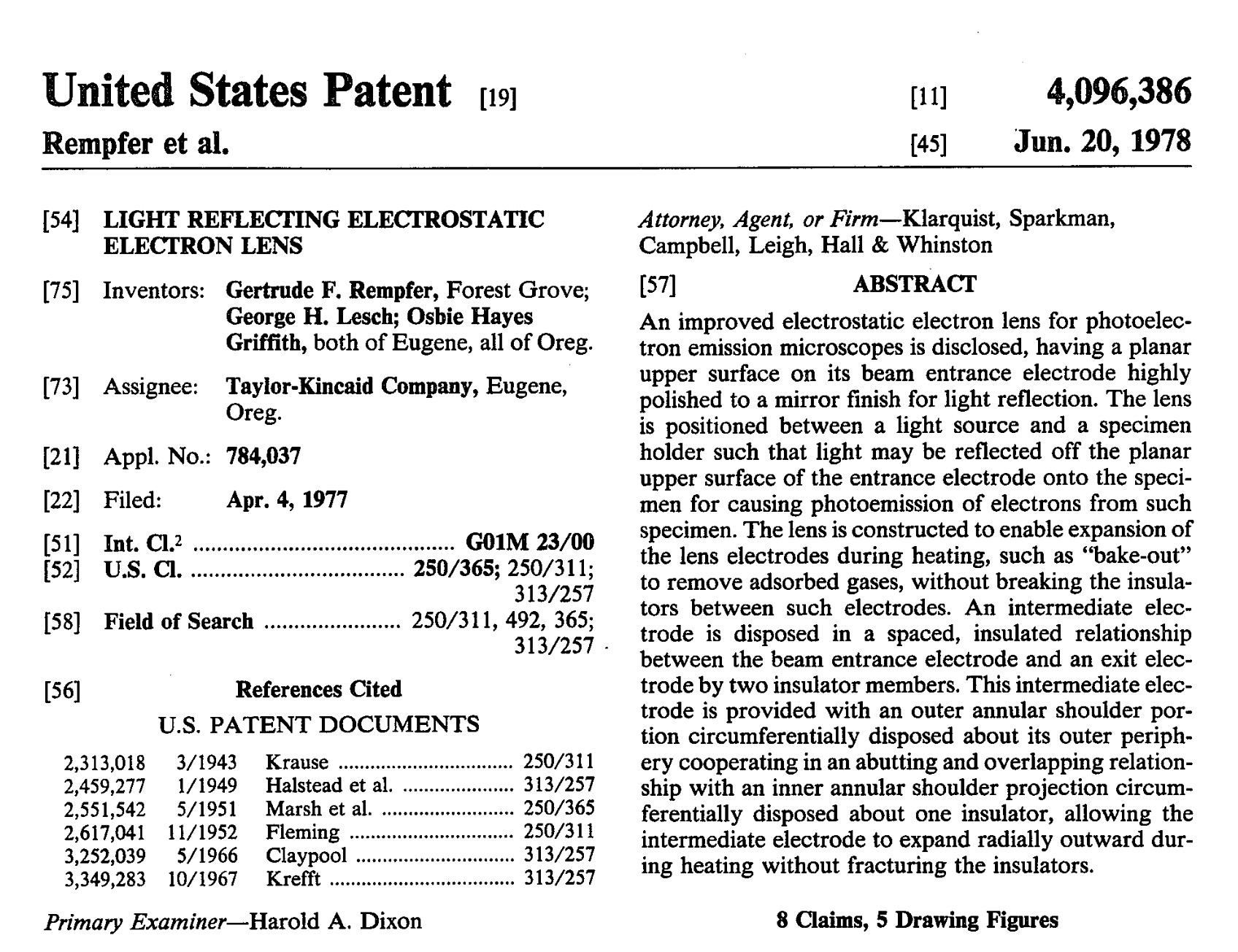
Face Page of US Patent 4096386, Gertrude F. Rempfer, coinventor

- Rempfer, Gertrude F. "A theoretical study of the hyperbolic electron mirror as a correcting element for spherical and chromatic aberration in electron optics." Journal of Applied Physics 67.10 (1990): 6027–6040.
- Griffith, O. Hayes, Rempfer, Gertrude F., "Photoelectron Imaging in Cell Biology", Ann. Rev. Biophys. Biophys. Chem. 14, 113–130 (1985).
- Rempfer, Gertrude F. Electron Diffraction Voltmeter, United States Patent 3,350,640, December 23, 1963.
