= Johannes Heydenreich =

German solid state physicist (1930 – 2015)

Johannes Heydenreich (June 20, 1930, in Plauen, Vogtland – June 24, 2015, in Halle (Saale)) was a German physicist who researched on the applications of electron microscopy in solid state physics and materials science.

== Education and career ==
Heydenreich was born in Plauen near Dresden. Heydenreich studied physics at the Pädagogische Hochschule "Karl Liebknecht" Potsdam from 1953 to 1958. In 1961, he was awarded a doctorate for his work on the visualization of surface defects of geometrical and electrical origin using a "straight-viewing" electron mirror (Sichtbarmachung von Oberflächenstörungen geometrischen und elektrischen Ursprungs mit Hilfe eines „geradsichtigen“ Elektronenspiegels) under Johannes Picht. It was during this time that he met the physicist Heinz Bethge, with whom he had a lifelong friendship.

In 1962, Heydenreich became deputy director of the Institute for Solid State Physics and Electron Microscopy (IFE) of the Academy of Sciences of the GDR in Halle (Saale). In 1969, he completed his habilitation at the University of Halle and was appointed professor there in 1973. In 1975, he founded the International Center for Electron Microscopy at the IFE and headed it. The center is visited twice a year by scientists from all over the world. Heydenreich later served as director of the academy institute for many years, from which the Max Planck Institute for Microstructure Physics, the first Max Planck Institute in the new states, was founded in 1992. From 1992 to his retirement in 1995, Heydenreich worked as department director and managing director at the Max Planck Institute for Microstructure Physics. During this time, he was the only department director of the Max Planck Society who had worked as a scientist in a leading position in the former GDR.

== Research ==
The scientific work of Heydenreich mainly dealt with the use of electron microscopy in solid state physics and materials characterization. He was the author of around 300 publications, including numerous monographs. His book Elektronenmikroskopie in der Festkörperphysik has been published in several editions and in German and English. He was a member of various editorial boards of scientific journals and participated in the organization of numerous European and global congresses.

== Honors and awards ==
In 1986, Heydenreich was elected a member of the German Academy of Sciences Leopoldina and was then Secretary of Natural Sciences there for many years. He was a corresponding member of the Academy of Sciences of the GDR. In 1998, he was awarded the Cross of Merit 1st Class of the Federal Republic of Germany. In 1999, he was awarded an honorary doctorate by the TU Chemnitz. He was an honorary member of the German Society for Electron Microscopy and was elected to the Heinz-Bethge Foundation for Applied Electron Microscopy.

== Bibliography ==
- Neumann, W.; Pasemann, M.; Heydenreich, J. (1982), "High-Resolution Electron Microscopy of Crystals", in Freyhardt, H. C. (ed.), Analytical Methods High-Melting Metals, vol. 7, Berlin, Heidelberg: Springer Berlin Heidelberg, pp. 1–46, doi:10.1007/978-3-642-68731-0_1, ISBN 978-3-642-68733-4
- Bethge, H.; Heydenreich, Johannes (1987). Electron microscopy in solid state physics. Amsterdam: Elsevier. ISBN 0-444-98967-6. OCLC 15221249.
- Heydenreich, Johannes (1982). Hochauflösende Elektronenmikroskopie in der Werkstofforschung. De Gruyter. doi:10.1515/9783112547762. ISBN 978-3-11-254776-2. S2CID 246745280.
- Heydenreich, Johannes; Luppa, Hans; Recknagel, Alfred; Stiller, Dankwart (1996), "2.6C Electron Microscopy in the Former German Democratic Republic", Advances in Imaging and Electron Physics, vol. 96, Elsevier, pp. 171–180, doi:10.1016/s1076-5670(08)70042-9, ISBN 978-0-12-014738-0
