= Max Planck Institute of Microstructure Physics =

German research institute

Coordinates: 51°29′43″N 11°56′29″E

The Max Planck Institute of Microstructure Physics in Halle (Saale) is a research institute in Germany focused on novel materials with useful functionalities. Active research topics includes spintronics, neuromorphic systems, superconductivity, nano-photonics, topological metals and insulators, 2D materials etc. It was founded in 1992 by Hellmut Fischmeister and is a follow-up to the German Academy of Sciences Institute of Solid State Physics and Electron Microscopy. The institute moved into new buildings from 1997 till 1999. It is one of 84 institutes in the Max Planck Society (Max-Planck-Gesellschaft).

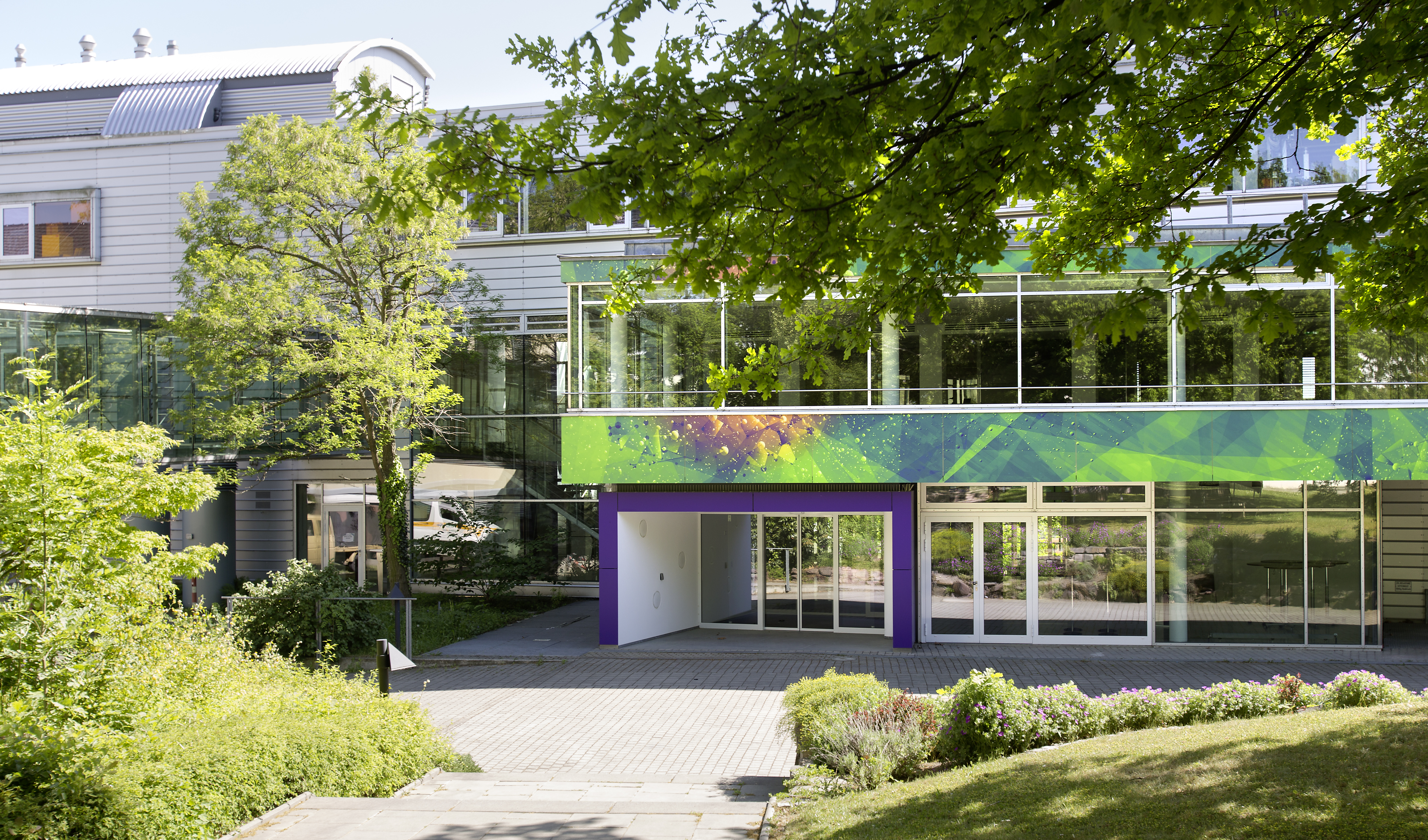
MPI of Microstructure Physics Halle (Saale), Main entrance

The institute has three main departments:

1. Prof. Dr. Stuart Parkin: Nano-systems from Ions, Spins and Electrons (NISE)
2. Dr. Wesley David Sacher: Nano-photonics, Integration and Neural Technology (NINT)
3. Prof. Dr. Xinliang Feng: Synthetic Materials and Functional Devices (SMFD)

Former departments include the following:

1. The Theory Department, headed by Prof. Eberhard Gross, mainly carries out theoretical research on the electronic, magnetic, optical, and electrical properties of micro- and nanostructured solid-state systems'.
2. The Experimental Department 1, headed by Prof. Jürgen Kirschner, mainly deals with the magnetic properties of dimensionally reduced systems and their dependence on electronic structure, crystalline structure and morphology.
3. The Experimental Department 2, headed by Prof. Ulrich Gösele, is focussed on the scientific understanding, design and fabrication of new materials for information, communication, engineering as well as bio-technological applications.
4. The Experimental Department 3, headed by Prof. Johannes Heydenreich, is focused on analytical methods using high-resolution electronic microscopy.

== PhD program ==
- The Max Planck Institute for Microstructure Physics, the Martin Luther University of Halle-Wittenberg, and the Fraunhofer Institute for Mechanics of Materials offer a PhD program under the "International Max-Planck Research School for Science and Technology of Nano-Systems (IMPRS-STNS)".
