= Feodor Ivanovich Vilesov =

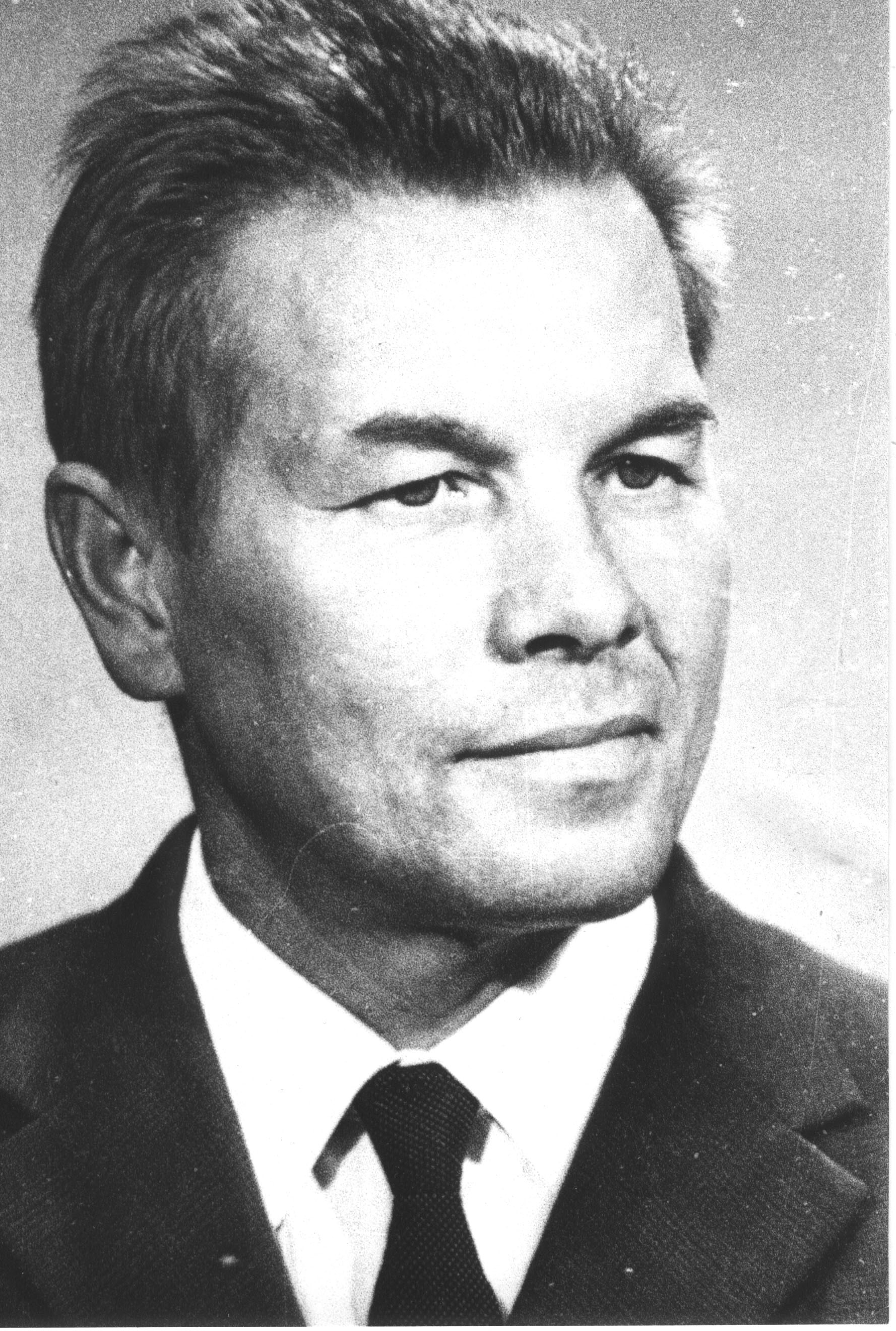
- Vilesov in 1977
- Born: November 13, 1925; Belyukovo, Perm Region, Russian SFSR, Soviet Union
- Died: February 8, 1978 (aged 52); Leningrad, Soviet Union
- Education: Leningrad State University
- Occupation: experimental physicist (Chemical physics)
- Organization: Leningrad State University
- Known for: Ultraviolet photoelectron spectroscopy Chemical physics
- Spouse: Vera Konstantinovna Adamchuk (m. 1956)
- Children: Andrey Feodorovich Vilesov
- Awards: USSR State Prize (1985)

Feodor Ivanovich Vilesov (Russian: Фёдор Иванович Вилесов; 13 November 1925 – 8 February 1978) was a Soviet experimental physicist whose main contributions are in the field of chemical physics.

== Education and early life ==
Vilesov was born in Belyukovo village near Kudymkar, in Komi-Permyak Okrug (autonomous national district), Perm region, Russian SFSR, Soviet Union, on November 13, 1925, to a couple of: Ivan Ilvich Vilesov and Vassa Vasilievna Vilesova. During 1943 -1950 he served in the Soviet Army. In 1950 he entered the Department of Physics, Leningrad State University, from which he graduated with an honorable diploma (master's degree) in 1955. He continued with his Ph. D. studies at the Institute of Physics, Leningrad State University, in the department of photonics led by Professor A. N. Terenin and in 1959 he defended his thesis “The Study of Photoionization of vapors of organic molecules and interrogation of the influence of adsorbed layers on photoelectric Emission from Semiconductor Catalysts”. He obtained his Doctor of Physical and Mathematical Sciences (a "higher doctorate") degree in 1966 for a thesis on the development of photoelectron spectroscopy in the gas phase and molecular solids entitled: “Photoionization of Organic Molecules”

== Career ==
From 1955 to 1978, he worked at the Institute for Physics of the Leningrad State University. Since 1964, he was the head of the department of photonics (photochemistry). In 1967 he becomes a professor in physics at Leningrad State University. In 1977-1978 he served as the dean of sciences of the Leningrad State University.

In a series of works in 1960–1962, Vilesov and his colleagues performed the first experiments on ultraviolet photoelectron spectroscopy (UPS) of molecular solids and gases. Since then ultraviolet photoelectron spectroscopy has been widely applied to study valence energy levels and chemical bonding, especially the bonding character of molecular orbitals.

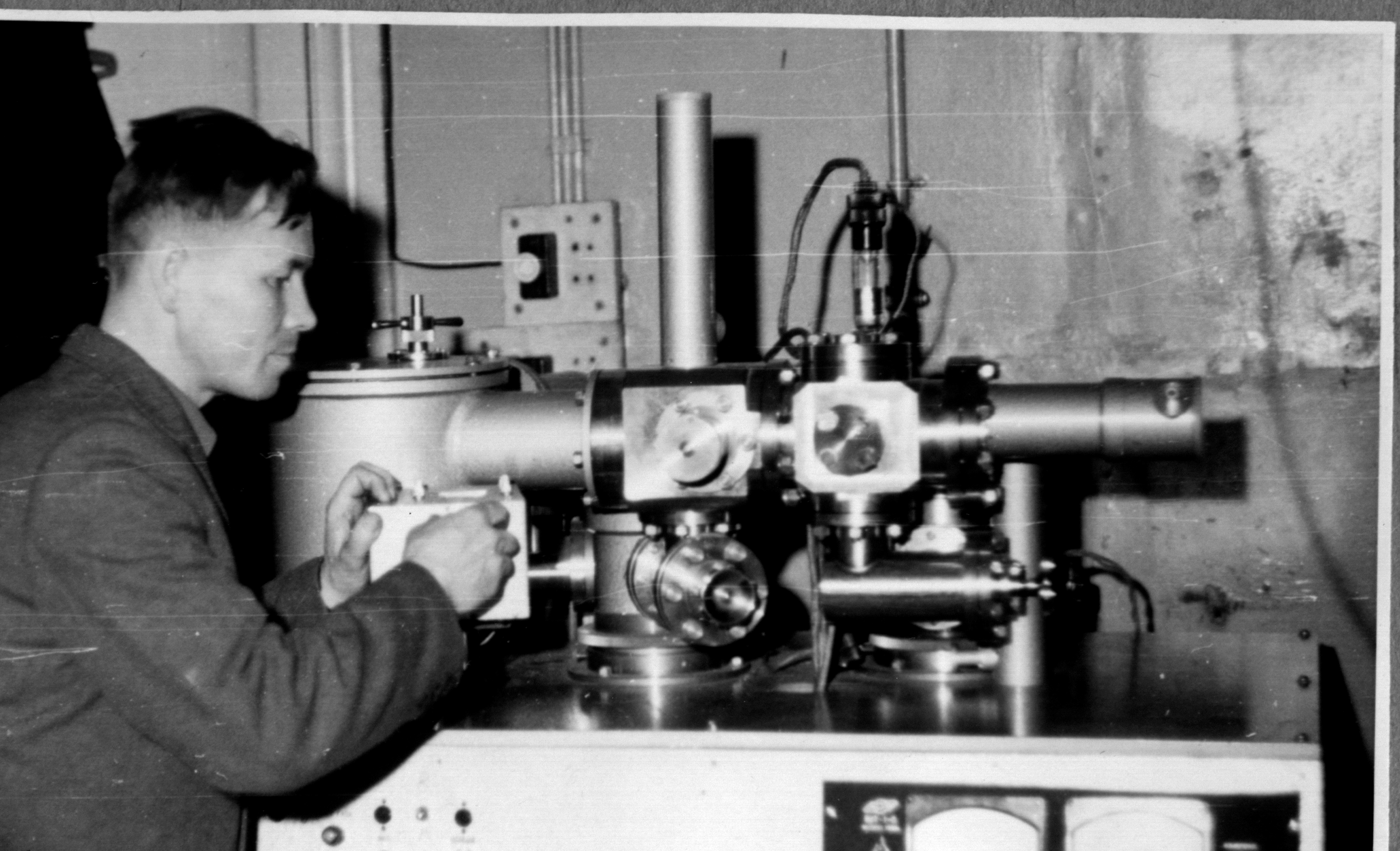
F. I. Vilesov at the Ultraviolet Photoelectron Spectrometer in 1963.

== Honors and awards ==
Vilesov was awarded the USSR State Prize in 1985 for the development of the method of photoelectron spectroscopy and its application in science and technology, published in 1961–1985.

== Personal life ==
Vilesov was the son of Ivan Ivanovich Vilesov (1906-1967) and Vassa Vasilievna (1905-1984). He was married to Vera Konstantinovna Adamchuk (1933-2016) and had 1 child, Andrey Feodorovich Vilesov.

He died on 8 February 1978 at the age of 52.
