= Ultraviolet photoelectron spectroscopy =

Measurement of kinetic energy spectra

Ultraviolet photoelectron spectroscopy (UPS) refers to the measurement of kinetic energy spectra of photoelectrons emitted by molecules that have absorbed ultraviolet photons, in order to determine molecular orbital energies in the valence region.

== Basic theory ==
If Albert Einstein's photoelectric law is applied to a free molecule, the kinetic energy ($E_\text{k}$) of an emitted photoelectron is given by

$$E_\text{k} = h\nu - I\,,$$

where h is the Planck constant, ν is the frequency of the ionizing light, and I is an ionization energy for the formation of a singly charged ion in either the ground state or an excited state. According to Koopmans' theorem, each such ionization energy may be identified with the energy of an occupied molecular orbital. The ground-state ion is formed by removal of an electron from the highest occupied molecular orbital, while excited ions are formed by removal of an electron from a lower occupied orbital.

== History ==
Before 1960, virtually all measurements of photoelectron kinetic energies were for electrons emitted from metals and other solid surfaces. In about 1956, Kai Siegbahn developed X-ray photoelectron spectroscopy (XPS) for surface chemical analysis. This method uses x-ray sources to study energy levels of atomic core electrons, and at the time had an energy resolution of about 1 eV (electronvolt).

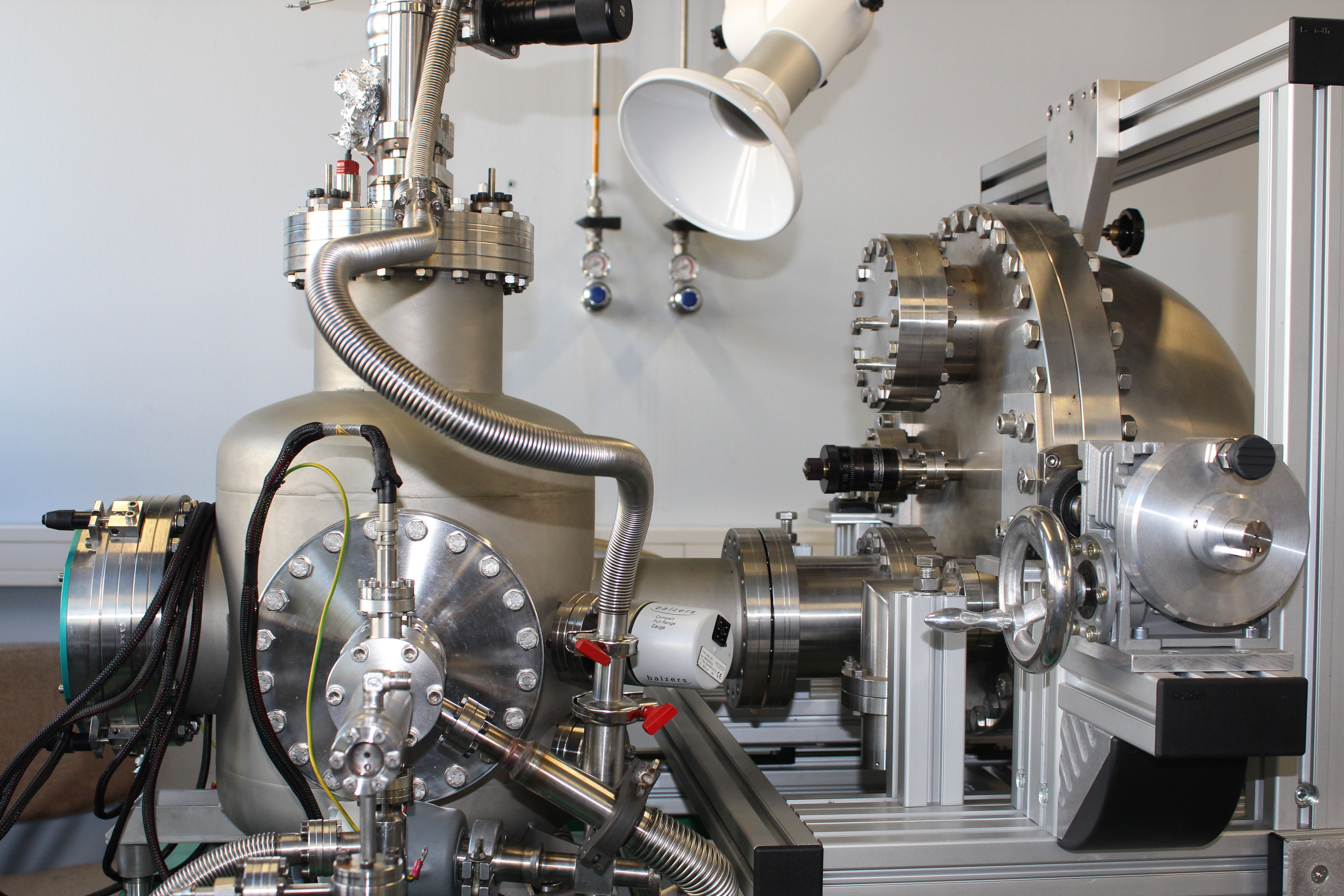
UPS in the gas phase, IPREM, Pau, France, Dr. JM Sotiropoulos, CNRS

The ultraviolet photoelectron spectroscopy (UPS) was pioneered by Feodor I. Vilesov, a physicist at St. Petersburg (Leningrad) State University in Russia (USSR) in 1961 to study the photoelectron spectra of free molecules in the gas phase. The early experiments used monochromatized radiation from a hydrogen discharge and a retarding potential analyzer to measure the photoelectron energies. The PES was further developed by David W. Turner, a physical chemist at Imperial College in London and then at Oxford University, in a series of publications from 1962 to 1967. As a photon source, he used a helium discharge lamp that emits a wavelength of 58.4 nm (corresponding to an energy of 21.2 eV) in the vacuum ultraviolet region. With this source, Turner's group obtained an energy resolution of 0.02 eV. Turner referred to the method as "molecular photoelectron spectroscopy", now usually "ultraviolet photoelectron spectroscopy" or UPS. As compared to XPS, UPS is limited to energy levels of valence electrons, but measures them more accurately. After 1967, commercial UPS spectrometers became available. One of the latest commercial devices was the Perkin Elmer PS18. For the last twenty years, the systems have been homemade. One of the latest in progress – Phoenix II – is that of the laboratory of Pau, IPREM developed by Dr. Jean-Marc Sotiropoulos.

== Application ==
The UPS measures experimental molecular orbital energies for comparison with theoretical values from quantum chemistry, which was also extensively developed in the 1960s. The photoelectron spectrum of a molecule contains a series of peaks each corresponding to one valence-region molecular orbital energy level. Also, the high resolution allowed the observation of fine structure due to vibrational levels of the molecular ion, which facilitates the assignment of peaks to bonding, nonbonding or antibonding molecular orbitals.

The method was later extended to the study of solid surfaces where it is usually described as photoemission spectroscopy (PES). It is particularly sensitive to the surface region (to 10 nm depth), due to the short range of the emitted photoelectrons (compared to X-rays). It is therefore used to study adsorbed species and their binding to the surface, as well as their orientation on the surface.

A useful result from characterization of solids by UPS is the determination of the work function of the material. An example of this determination is given by Park et al. Briefly, the full width of the photoelectron spectrum (from the highest kinetic energy/lowest binding energy point to the low kinetic energy cutoff) is measured and subtracted from the photon energy of the exciting radiation, and the difference is the work function. Often, the sample is electrically biased negative to separate the low energy cutoff from the spectrometer response.

=== Gas discharge lines ===
Gas	Emission line	Energy	Wavelength	Relative intensity
H	Lyman α	10.20 eV	121.57 nm	100%
H	Lyman β	12.09 eV	102.57 nm	10%
He	1 α	21.22 eV	58.43 nm	100%
He	1 β	23.09 eV	53.70 nm	approx 1.5%
He	1 γ	23.74 eV	52.22 nm	0.5%
He	2 α	40.81 eV	30.38 nm	100%
He	2 β	48.37 eV	25.63 nm	< 10%
He	2 γ	51.02 eV	24.30 nm	negligible
Ne	1 α	16.67 eV	74.37 nm	15%
Ne	1 α	16.85 eV	73.62 nm	100%
Ne	1 β	19.69 eV	62.97 nm	< 1%
Ne	1 β	19.78 eV	62.68 nm	< 1%
Ne	2 α	26.81 eV	46.24 nm	100%
Ne	2 α	26.91 eV	46.07 nm	100%
Ne	2 β	27.69 eV	44.79 nm	20%
Ne	2 β	27.76 eV	44.66 nm	20%
Ne	2 β	27.78 eV	44.63 nm	20%
Ne	2 β	27.86 eV	44.51 nm	20%
Ne	2 γ	30.45 eV	40.71 nm	20%
Ne	2 γ	30.55 eV	40.58 nm	20%
Ar	1	11.62 eV	106.70 nm	100%
Ar	1	11.83 eV	104.80 nm	50%
Ar	2	13.30 eV	93.22 nm	30%
Ar	2	13.48 eV	91.84 nm	15%

== Outlook ==
UPS has seen a considerable revival with the increasing availability of synchrotron light sources that provide a wide range of monochromatic photon energies.

== See also ==
- Angle resolved photoemission spectroscopy (ARPES)
- Photoelectron photoion coincidence spectroscopy (PEPICO)
- Time-resolved two-photon photoelectron spectroscopy
