= David W. Turner =

British physical chemist (born 1927)

David Warren Turner (born 16 July 1927) is a British physical chemist known for the development of ultra-violet photoelectron spectroscopy (UPS), a technique for the measurement of molecular orbital energies in gas-phase molecules.

His first paper on photoelectron spectroscopy was published in 1962 when he worked at Imperial College in London. In 1967 he moved to Oxford University to continue his research in Oxford's Physical Chemistry Laboratory as Fellow and Tutor at Balliol College, where he spent the rest of his career.

He was elected a Fellow of the Royal Society in 1973.
