= Convergent beam electron diffraction =

Electron scattering technique for structural analyses

Convergent beam electron diffraction (CBED) is an electron diffraction technique where a convergent or divergent beam (conical electron beam) of electrons is used to study materials.

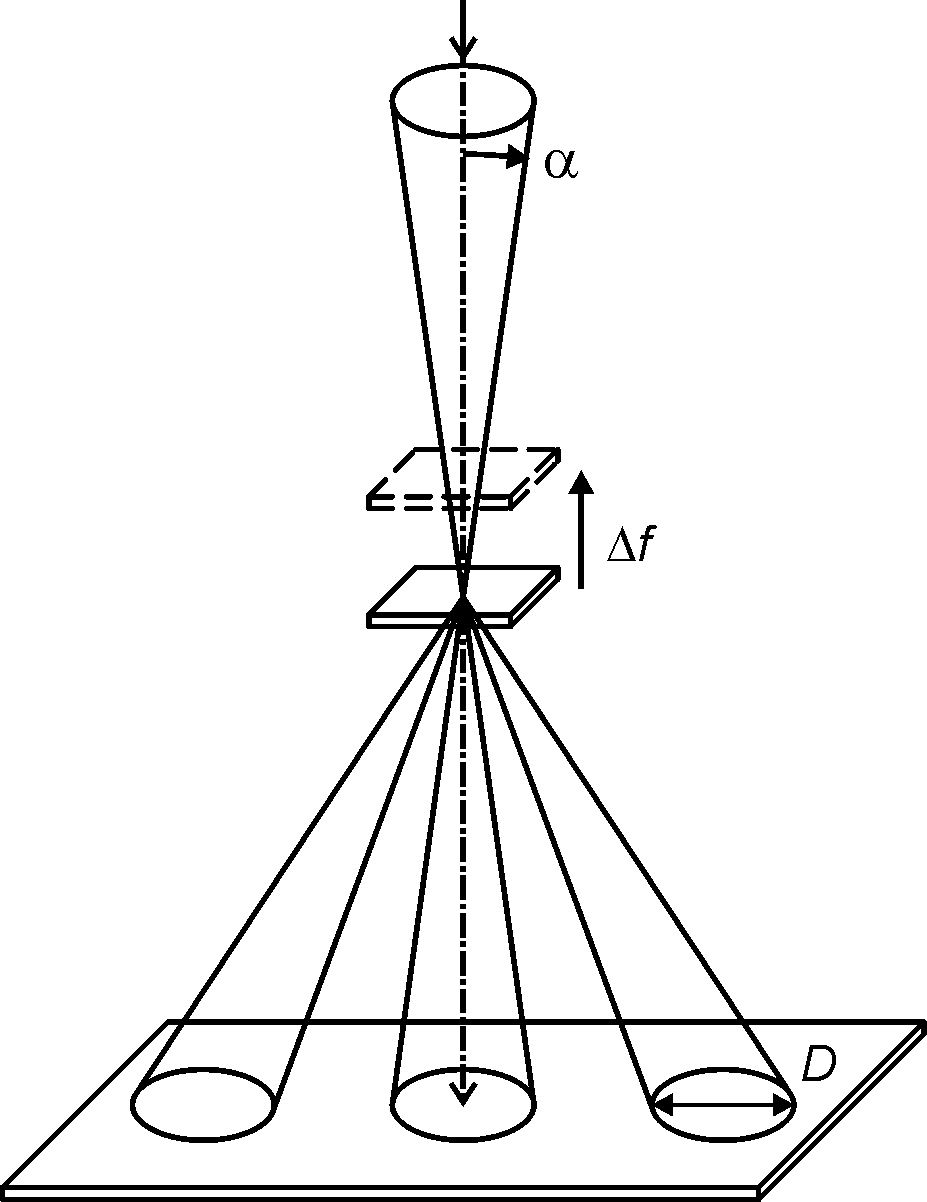
CBED scheme, adapted from W. Kossel and G. Möllenstedt, Elektroneninterferenzen im konvergenten Bündel, Annalen der Physik 36, 113 (1939).

== History ==
CBED was first introduced in 1939 by Kossel and Möllenstedt. The development of the Field Emission Gun (FEG) in the 1970s, the Scanning Transmission Electron Microscopy (STEM), energy filtering devices and so on, made possible smaller probe diameters and larger convergence angles, and all this made CBED more popular. In the seventies, CBED was being used for the determination of the point group and space group symmetries by Goodman and Lehmpfuh, and Buxton, and starting in 1985, CBED was used by Tanaka et al. for studying crystal structure.

== Applications ==
By using CBED, the following information can be obtained:

- parameters of the crystal lattice, sample thickness
- strain distribution
- defects such as stacking faults, dislocations, grain boundaries, three-dimensional deformations, lattice displacements
- crystal symmetry information - by looking at the symmetries that appear in the CBED disks, point group and space group determination.
- Diagnosis of aberrations in the electron probe that limit resolution, through analysis of CBED patterns (Ronchigrams) acquired on amorphous specimens.

== Parameters ==
- Positions of the CBED disks are the same as the positions of the Bragg peaks and are given approximately by the relation:

$$2 d_{hkl} \sin\theta_{\rm B} = n \lambda,$$
where $d_{hkl}$ is the distance between the crystallographic planes $(h,k,l)$, $\theta_{\rm B}$ is the Bragg angle, $n$ is an integer, and $\lambda$ is the wavelength of the probing electrons.

- The beam convergence semi-angle $\alpha$ - is controlled by the C2 aperture. The probing beam convergence semi-angle, $\alpha$, is of the order of milliradians, ranging from 0.1˚ to 1˚. For small convergence semi-angle, the CBED disks do not overlap with each other, whereas for larger semi-convergence angles, the disks overlap.
- The diameter of a CBED disk is given by the beam convergence semi-angle $\alpha$:

$$D = \frac{4\pi}{\lambda} \sin \alpha.$$

- Defocus $\Delta f$: The distance between the crossover of the probing beam and the $z$ position of the specimen is called the defocus distance $\Delta f$. The sample can be moved along the $z$ axis. At a defocus distance, both the direct space and reciprocal space information are visible in the CBED pattern.

== Related techniques ==
- Conventional (C)TEM-CBED: In CTEM-CBED different shaped condenser apertures are used to obtain the intensity distribution over the entire Brillouin zone.
- Large Angle (LA)CBED: (LA)CBED is performed with a large incident angle, ranging from 1˚ to 10˚. LACBED makes it possible to obtain non-overlapping disks with a larger diameter than the one determined by the Bragg angle. With LACBED I one can obtain one selected CBED disk at a time on a detector. In LACBED II, with a slight change in the focusing conditions of the intermediate lens, bright field patterns and dark field patterns can be obtained simultaneously, without overlapping each other on the fluorescent screen. A disadvantage of LACBED is that it requires a large, flat specimen.
- 4D-STEM: In 4D-STEM a convergent probing beam is raster-scanned on a specimen in a 2D array and in each position of the array, a 2D diffraction pattern is obtained, thus generating a 4D data set. After acquisition, by using different phase techniques such as ptychography, one can recover the transmission function and the induced phase shift. In some applications, 4D-STEM is called STEM-CBED.
- Beam Rocking (BR)-CBED: With this technique, by rocking the incident beam with a rocking coil placed above the specimen, a virtual convergent beam is produced. Given that the diameter of the beam on the specimen is a few micrometers, this method has made CBED possible for materials that are susceptible to strong convergent beams. Furthermore, the large size of the illuminated specimen area and the low density current of the beam make specimen contamination insignificant.
- BR-LACBED: In this technique, in addition to the rocking coil above the specimen, there is a rocking coil placed under the projector lens, which is used to bring the preferred beam to the STEM detector. Every time the incident beam is rocked, the second coil is simultaneously driven so that the beam always falls on the STEM detector.
- Signal processing and BR-CBED: In order to enhance contrast in BR-CBED, a band-pass filter can be used that filters a certain frequency band in the CBED pattern. The combination of these two techniques makes the symmetries appearing in the patterns more clear.
- CB-LEED (Low Energy Electron Diffraction): Rocking curves are analyzed at a single energy using a convergent probe. Advantages of this method are: mapping of LEED diffraction spots into CBLEED disks, the diffraction patterns originate from a localized region of the specimen which enables the extraction of localized structural information, mapping out of the surfaces, sensitivity enhancement of small atomic displacements etc.
- Ptychography is a technique for recovering the phase of the exit electron wave. The reconstruction is done by applying an iterative phase retrieval algorithm which returns a real-space image with both phase and amplitude information. By using electron ptychography, in 2018, images of MoS_{2} with an atomic resolution of 0.39 Å were reported by Jiang et al. which set the new world record for the highest resolution microscope.
- Microdiffraction, nanodiffraction: In the literature, there are several terms used to refer to electron diffraction patterns that are acquired with a convergent beam. Such terms are CBED, microdiffraction, nanodiffraction etc. When the CBED technique is used for the acquisition of conventional diffraction information like lattice structure and interplanar spacing from very small areas, then the term microdiffraction is used. On the other hand, the term nanodiffraction is used when very small probes (< 1 nm or less in diameter) are used.

== Advantages and disadvantages of CBED ==
Since the diameter of the probing convergent beam is smaller than in the case of a parallel beam, most of the information in the CBED pattern is obtained from very small regions, which other methods cannot reach. For example, in Selected Area Electron Diffraction (SAED), where a parallel beam illumination is used, the smallest area that can be selected is 0.5 μm at 100 kV, whereas in CBED, it is possible to go to areas smaller than 100 nm. Also, the amount of information that is obtained from a CBED pattern is larger than that from a SAED pattern. Nonetheless, CBED also has its disadvantages. The focused probe may generate contamination, which can cause localized stresses. Another disadvantage is that the convergent beam may heat or damage the chosen region of the specimen.
