= Detectors for transmission electron microscopy =

Scientific instruments

There are a variety of technologies available for detecting and recording the images, diffraction patterns, and electron energy loss spectra produced using transmission electron microscopy (TEM).

Diagram showing the basic design of Scintillator-coupled (Indirect) and Direct electron detectors.

== Traditional detection techniques ==
Traditionally, TEM images or diffraction patterns could be observed using a fluorescent viewing screen, consisting of powdered ZnS or ZnS/CdS, which is excited by the electron beam via cathodoluminescence. Once the microscopist could see a suitable image on their viewing screen, images could then be recorded using photographic film. For electron microscopes, film typically consisted of a gelatin and silver halide emulsion layer on a plastic support base. The silver halide would be converted to silver upon exposure to the electron beam, and the film could then be chemically developed to form an image, which could be digitized for analysis using a film scanner. In modern TEMs, film has largely been replaced by electronic detectors.

== CCD cameras ==
Charge coupled device (CCD) cameras were first applied to transmission electron microscopy in the 1980s and later became widespread. For use in a TEM, CCDs are typically coupled with a scintillator such as single crystal Yttrium aluminium garnet (YAG) in which electrons from the electron beam are converted to photons, which are then transferred to the sensor of the CCD via a fiber optic plate. The main reason for this is that direct exposure to the high energy electron beam risks damaging the sensor CCD. A typical CCD for a TEM will also incorporate a Peltier cooling device to reduce the temperature of the sensor to approximately -30 °C, which reduces dark current and improves signal-to-noise.

The noise of TEM or scanning TEM (STEM) measurements performed on such scintillation-based CCD detectors therefore mainly consists of two major noise contributions, Poisson noise originating from the quantized nature of the beam electrons and Gaussian distributed detector noises. Due to the conversion of beam electrons into photons within the scintillation layer, which results in multiple hundreds to thousands of photons being created per incident beam electron, the Poisson noise distribution appears altered by a gain and takes the shape of a super-Poissonian distribution with respect to the created photons measured on the CCD. As a direct consequence of the creation process yielding a multitude of photons per incident beam electron, the Poisson noise of the photons is heavily correlated.

== CMOS cameras ==
Since 2006, scintillator and fiber optic coupled cameras based on complementary metal oxide semiconductor (CMOS) electronics have become commercially available for TEM. CMOS cameras have some advantages for electron microscopy compared to CCD cameras. One advantage is that CMOS cameras are less prone than CCD cameras to blooming, i.e. the spreading of charge from oversaturated pixels into nearby pixels. Another advantage is that CMOS cameras can have faster readout speeds.

== Direct electron detectors ==
The use of scintillators to convert electrons to photons in CCD and CMOS cameras reduces the detective quantum efficiency (DQE) of these devices. Direct electron detectors, which have no scintillator and are directly exposed to the electron beam, typically offer higher DQE than scintillator-coupled cameras. There are two main types of direct electron detectors, both of which were first introduced to electron microscopy in the 2000s.

A hybrid pixel detector, also known as a pixel array detector (PAD) features a sensor chip bonded to a separate electronics chip with each pixel read out in parallel. The pixels are typically wide and thick e.g. 150 x 150 x 500 μm for the electron microscope pixel array detector (EMPAD) described by Tate et al. This large pixel size allows each pixel to fully absorb high-energy electrons, enabling high dynamic range. However, the large pixel size limits the number of pixels that can be incorporated into a sensor.

A monolithic active pixel sensor (MAPS) for TEM is a CMOS-based detector that has been radiation hardened to withstand direct exposure to the electron beam. The sensitive layer of the MAPS is typically very thin, with a thickness as low as 8 μm. This reduces the lateral spread of electrons from the electron beam within the detective layer of the sensor, allowing for smaller pixel sizes e.g. 6.5 x 6.5 μm for a Direct Electron DE-16. Smaller pixel size allows for a large number of pixels to be incorporated into a sensor, although the dynamic range is typically more limited than for a hybrid pixel detector.

== Detectors for Scanning TEM (STEM) ==
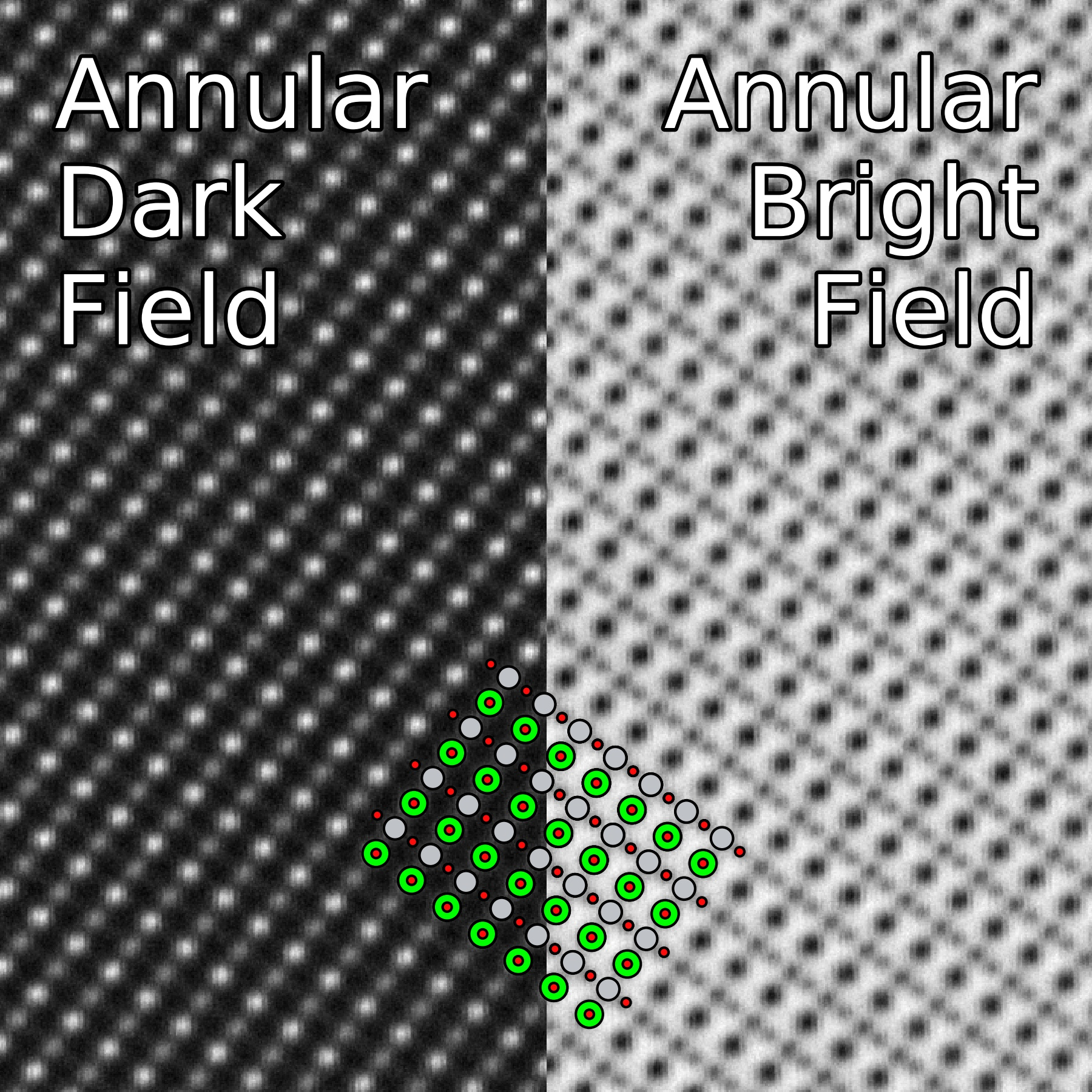
Atomic resolution imaging of SrTiO_{3}, using annular dark field (ADF) and annular bright field (ABF) detectors. Overlay: strontium (green), titanium (grey), and oxygen (red).

In scanning TEM (STEM), a focused probe is rastered over an area of interest, and a signal is recorded at each probe position to form an image. This typically requires different types of detector from conventional TEM imaging, in which a broad area of the specimen is illuminated. Traditional STEM imaging involves detectors, such as the annular dark-field (ADF) detector, which integrate the signal resulting from electrons from within a given range of scattering angles at each position of the raster. Such detectors may typically consist of a scintillator connected to photomultiplier tube.

Segmented STEM detectors allow differential phase contrast information to be obtained. Early versions used scintillators with light pipes connected to multiple photomultipliers (one for each segment), which are bulky but have high detective quantum efficiency. Later designs, used lithographically patterned semiconductor diodes, which are more compact and easier to scale to multiple segments.

4D STEM involves the use of an imaging camera, such as the hybrid pixel or MAPS direct electron detectors described above, to record an entire set of convergent beam electron diffraction (CBED) patterns at each STEM raster position. The resulting four-dimensional dataset can then be analyzed to reconstruct arbitrary STEM images, or extract other types of information from the specimen, such as strain, electric or magnetic field maps.
