= Nature Methods =

- Discipline: Life Sciences
- Language: English
- Edited by: Allison Doerr

Publication details
- History: 2004–present
- Publisher: Nature Portfolio
- Frequency: Monthly
- Impact factor: 28.3 (2025)

Standard abbreviations
- ISO 4: Nat. Methods

Indexing
- CODEN: NMAEA3
- ISSN: 1548-7091 (print); 1548-7105 (web)
- LCCN: 2004214152
- OCLC no.: 56476033

Links
- Journal homepage; Online archive

Nature Methods is a monthly peer-reviewed scientific journal covering new scientific techniques. It was established in 2004 and is published by Springer Nature under the Nature Portfolio. Like other Nature journals, there is no external editorial board and editorial decisions are made by an in-house team, although peer review by external experts forms a part of the review process. The editor-in-chief is Allison Doerr.

== Method of the Year ==
Each January, Nature Methods designates a "Method of the Year" — a field, approach or technique that the editors judge to have enabled major recent advances in the life sciences. The selection is accompanied by a special issue containing an editorial, primer-style commentaries and a "News Feature" by the journal's technology editor. The award has been given annually since 2007 and frequently highlights experimental and computational techniques that transform how biological data are generated or analysed.

=== Selections by year ===
Nature Methods Method of the Year, 2007–2025
Year	Method	Brief description	Editorial reference
2007	Next-generation DNA sequencing	Massively parallel short-read platforms (e.g. Illumina, 454, SOLiD) that increased sequencing throughput by several orders of magnitude.	
2008	Super-resolution microscopy	Fluorescence imaging techniques such as STED, PALM and STORM that surpass the optical diffraction limit.	
2009	Induced pluripotent stem cells	Reprogramming of somatic cells into a pluripotent state, enabling patient-specific disease models and regenerative medicine research.	
2010	Optogenetics	Genetically encoded opsins that allow neural activity to be controlled with light at millisecond timescales.	
2011	Gene-editing nucleases	Programmable zinc-finger nucleases, TALENs and engineered meganucleases used for targeted genome editing.	
2012	Targeted proteomics	Mass-spectrometry workflows such as selected reaction monitoring (SRM/MRM) that quantify pre-defined sets of proteins with high reproducibility.	
2013	Single-cell sequencing	Genomic, transcriptomic and epigenomic profiling at the resolution of individual cells.	
2014	Light sheet fluorescence microscopy	Plane-illumination microscopy that enables high-speed, low-phototoxicity 3D imaging of living embryos and tissues.	
2015	Cryo-electron microscopy	Single-particle cryo-EM, enabled by direct electron detectors and improved software, achieving near-atomic resolution structures of biomolecules in solution.	
2016	Epitranscriptome analysis	Sequencing-based profiling of chemical modifications on RNA, such as m^{6}A, pseudouridine and inosine.	
2017	Organoids	Three-dimensional self-organising tissue cultures derived from stem cells.	
2018	Imaging in freely behaving animals	Miniaturised head-mounted microscopes and animal-tracking imaging systems for recording neuronal activity during natural behaviours in unrestrained model organisms.	
2019	Single-cell multimodal omics	Joint measurement of multiple molecular layers (e.g. genome+transcriptome, transcriptome+chromatin) within the same single cell.	
2020	Spatially resolved transcriptomics	Sequencing- and imaging-based methods that locate gene-expression measurements within intact tissue sections.	
2021	Protein structure prediction	Deep-learning systems such as AlphaFold 2 and RoseTTAFold that predict protein 3D structure from sequence at near-experimental accuracy.	
2022	Long-read sequencing	Single-molecule platforms from PacBio and Oxford Nanopore producing reads of tens of kilobases, enabling high-quality genome assemblies and detection of structural variants and DNA modifications.	
2023	Stem-cell-based embryo models	Self-organising 3D cultures derived from pluripotent stem cells that recapitulate aspects of mammalian embryogenesis.	
2024	Spatial proteomics	Imaging and mass-spectrometry approaches that map proteins and post-translational modifications across intact tissues at sub-cellular resolution.	
2025	Electron-microscopy-based connectomics	Volume electron microscopy combined with AI-assisted reconstruction to map synaptic-resolution wiring diagrams of nervous systems, including whole-brain connectomes of model organisms such as Drosophila.	

According to the Journal Citation Reports, the journal had a 2025 impact factor of 28.3, ranking it first in the category "Biochemical Research Methods".

== See also ==
- Nature Protocols
- Bioinformatics
- List of scientific journals in biology
- ISCB Bioinformatics Core Competencies
