= Nestor J. Zaluzec =

American scientist and inventor

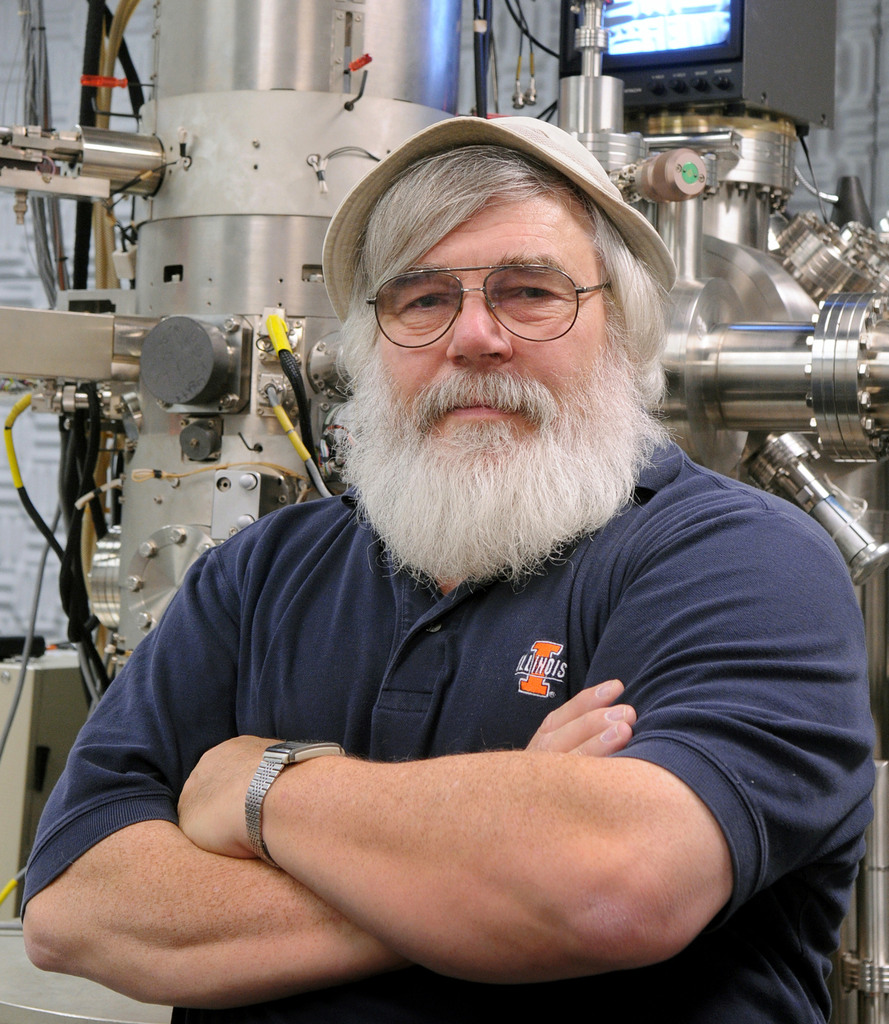
Zaluzec at the ANL AAEM/SCEM in 2009.

Nestor J. Zaluzec is an American scientist and inventor who worked at the University of Chicago and Argonne National Laboratory from 1979-2025 and is now an independent researcher. He invented and patented the Plasma Cleaner for Electron Microscopy the Scanning Confocal Electron Microscope and the π Steradian Transmission X-ray Detector for Electron-Optical Beam Lines and Microscopes.

== Career ==
A Fellow of Oak Ridge National Laboratory (ORNL), the University of Chicago/CASE and Northwestern University/NAISE collaboratories, Zaluzec has and continues to hold the tripartite role of Senior Scientist, Educator and Inventor now having a Quondamship from Argonne and the University of Chicago. As an innovator, his research includes development state-of-the art of instrumentation and techniques for atomic resolution x-ray & electron spectroscopy, and electron microscopy. In addition to creating tools for science, as a researcher he also uses these bleeding edge technologies to study vexing problems in technologically important materials. His work over the last 50 years has included studies in the areas of structural phase transformation in metals, radiation damage in alloys, ceramic oxides for geologic immobilization of nuclear waste materials, elemental segregation in a wide range of materials ranging from metals and catalysts to semiconductors and superconductors, magnetic dichroism, studies of optical photovoltaics and plasmonics in coupled and hybrid nanostructures, and more recently photo-catalysts, bio-materials and the interaction of particles in nanofluidic systems. He continues to investigate how aberration-corrected instruments can be re-engineered to improve the sensitivity of spectroscopy in analytical, multi-modal, multi-dimensional, in-situ studies of hard and soft materials. He was one of the earliest to realize the potential impact of the Internet on science and established the TelePresence Microscopy Collaboratory, which has served as a model for outreach to both the scientific and education communities providing unencumbered access to scientific resources. In addition to his roles as an adjunct professor at various Illinois universities, he also strives to engage the next generation of scientists through his work with the Illinois Junior Academy of Science, where he continues to interact on a one-to-one basis with middle and high school students.

=== Electron microscopy ===
Zaluzec has made wide-ranging contributions to the field of electron microscopy and microanalysis beginning with his seminal work on quantitative x-ray and electron spectroscopy, which has been disseminated throughout the scientific and academic communities through hundreds of lectures, short courses and/or seminars at scientific conferences and meetings around the globe. He developed Lorentz STEM imaging, High Angular Resolution Electron Channeling X-ray Spectroscopy (HARECXS), High Angular Resolution Electron Channeling Electron Spectroscopy (HARECES), Position Resolved Diffraction, as well as his invention of the scanning confocal electron microscope and the π steradian Transmission X-ray Detector, for which he was given the R&D 100 Awards in 2003 and 2010 respectively. In 2021 his most recent technological contribution to metrology, the X-ray Perimeter Array Detector (XPAD), was recognized as the worlds most sensitive x-ray detector in an analytical electron microscope (AEM). His current R&D research revolves around the Analytical Picoprobe Electron Optical Beam Line which incorporates a collection of his technologies into a single instrument and has been realized in a commercial instrument the ThermoFisher Spectra 30-300 UtraX/Illiad.

His professional leadership, includes the Midwest Microscopy and Microanalysis Society (MMMS) and numerous positions in the Microscopy Society of America (MSA) to which was elected President in 2009. He is the recipient of numerous professional achievement awards which include: Fellow and Distinguished Scientist of the Microscopy Society of America, Fellow of the Microanalysis Society, the Presidential Science and the Peter Duncumb Awards in Microanalysis from the Microanalysis Society, Distinguished Alumni Award from the College of Engineering at the University of Illinois, the Professional Achievement Alumni Award from Illinois Institute of Technology, the August Kohler Award from the State Microscopical Society of Illinois, Distinguished Service and Lifetime Member Awards Australian Microscopy and Microanalysis Society, the Maser Distinguished Service Award from Microscopy Society of America, and the E.F. Burton Award for Contributions to Microscopy by a Young Scientist, the Science Digest "One of America's 100 Brightest Scientists" Award, two R&D 100 Awards as well as Microscopy-Today Innovations Award.

He established and was the first Director of the Electron Microscopy Center at Argonne National Laboratory, and has held various Adjunct Professorial Appointments at Illinois Universities (IIT, UIUC, UIC, and NIU) and is a member of 7 professional microscopy societies (MSA, Microbeam Analysis Society, Microscopical Society of Canada, Australian Microscopy and Microanalysis Society, New Zealand Microscopy Society, European Microscopy Society, MMMS), and has served on 5 national committees. Zaluzec has also served the professional community of fellow scientists in a number of other ways as a volunteer (1980–present). Since 1993, he has also administered and operated the Microscopy Listserver a communication form that links over three thousand microscopists and microanalysts worldwide.
