= Ronchigram =

Shadow image mainly used to correct aberrations

Ronchigram (after Italian physicist Vasco Ronchi [ˈroŋki]) is the convergent beam diffraction pattern of a known object with features comparable to the diffracting wavelength. In the case of electron Ronchigrams amorphous materials are used. The structure of the Ronchigram encodes information about the aberration phase field across the objective aperture. As such, Ronchigrams have become increasingly important with the invention of aberration corrected scanning transmission electron microscopy.
