= Magic angle (EELS) =

The magic angle is a particular value of the collection angle of an electron microscope at which the measured energy-loss spectrum "magically" becomes independent of the tilt angle of the sample with respect to the beam direction. The magic angle is not uniquely defined for isotropic samples, but the definition is unique in the (typical) case of small angle scattering on materials with a "c-axis", such as graphite.

The "magic" angle depends on both the incoming electron energy (which is typically fixed) and the energy loss suffered by the electron. The ratio of the magic angle $\theta_M$ to the characteristic angle $\theta_E$ is roughly independent of the energy loss and roughly independent of the particular type of sample considered.

== Mathematical definition ==
For the case of a relativistic incident electron, the "magic" angle is defined by the equality of two different functions (denoted below by $A$ and $C$) of the collection angle $\alpha$:

$A(\alpha)=\frac{1}{2}\int_0^{\alpha^2}dx\frac{x}{(x+\theta_E^2{(1-\beta^2))}^2}$

and

$C(\alpha)=\theta_E^2{(1-\beta^2)}^2\int_0^{\alpha^2}dx\frac{1}{{(x+\theta_E^2(1-\beta^2))}^2}$

where $\beta$ is the speed of the incoming electron divided by the speed of light (N.B., the symbol $\beta$ is also often used in the older literature to denote the collection angle instead of $\alpha$).

Of course, the above integrals may easily be evaluated in terms of elementary functions, but they are presented as above because in the above form it is easier to see that the former integral is due to momentum transfers which are perpendicular to the beam direction, whereas the latter is due to momentum transfers parallel to the beam direction.

Using the above definition, it is then found that $\theta_M\approx 2\theta_E$
