= Dark-field microscopy =

Laboratory technique

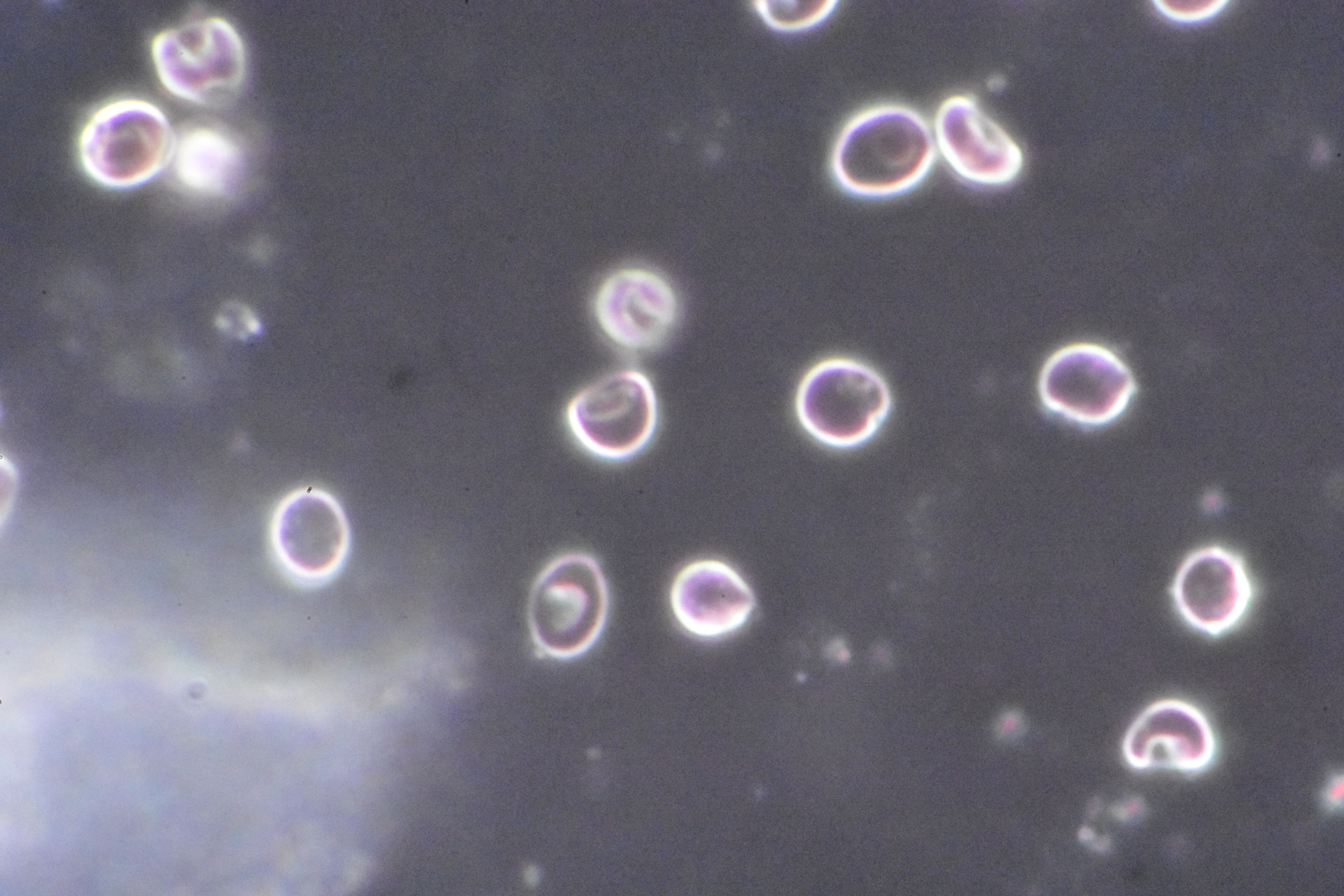
Red blood cells as seen by dark-field microscopy

Dark-field microscopy, also called dark-ground microscopy, describes microscopy methods, in both light and electron microscopy, which exclude the unscattered beam from the image. Consequently, the field around the specimen (i.e., where there is no specimen to scatter the beam) is generally dark.

In optical microscopes a darkfield condenser lens must be used, which directs a cone of light away from the objective lens. To maximize the scattered light-gathering power of the objective lens, oil immersion is used and the numerical aperture (NA) of the objective lens must be less than 1.0. Objective lenses with a higher NA can be used but only if they have an adjustable diaphragm, which reduces the NA. Often these objective lenses have a NA that is variable from 0.7 to 1.25.

== Light microscopy applications ==
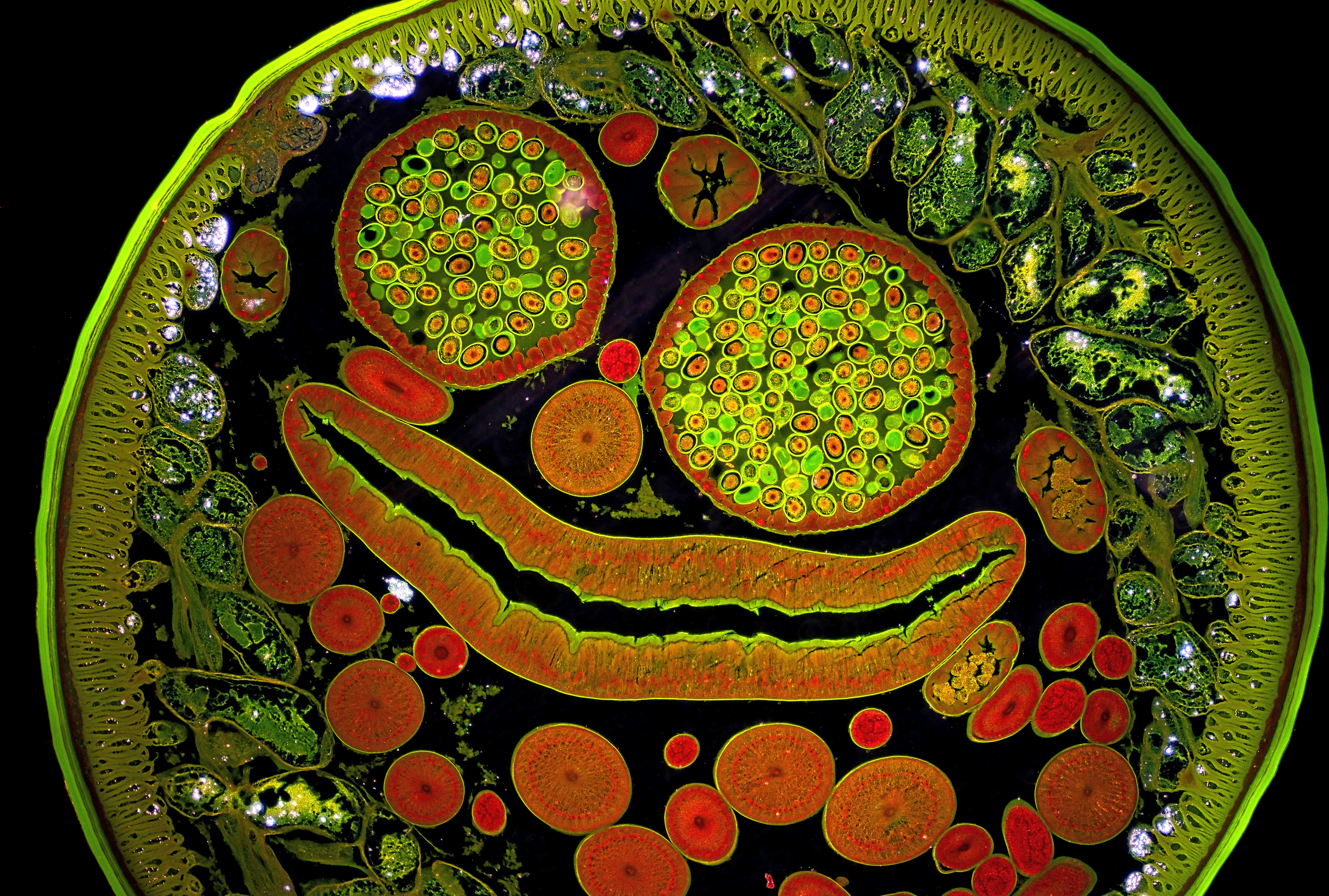
A cross-section of a nematode, photographed with an oil dark field condenser with a numerical aperture of 1.40

In optical microscopy, dark-field describes an illumination technique used to enhance the contrast in unstained samples. It works by illuminating the sample with light that will not be collected by the objective lens and thus will not form part of the image. This produces the classic appearance of a dark, almost black, background with bright objects on it. Optical dark fields usually done with an condenser that features a central light-stop in front of the light source to prevent direct illumination of the focal plane, and at higher numerical apertures may require oil or water between the condenser and the specimen slide to provide an optimal refractive index.

=== The light's path ===
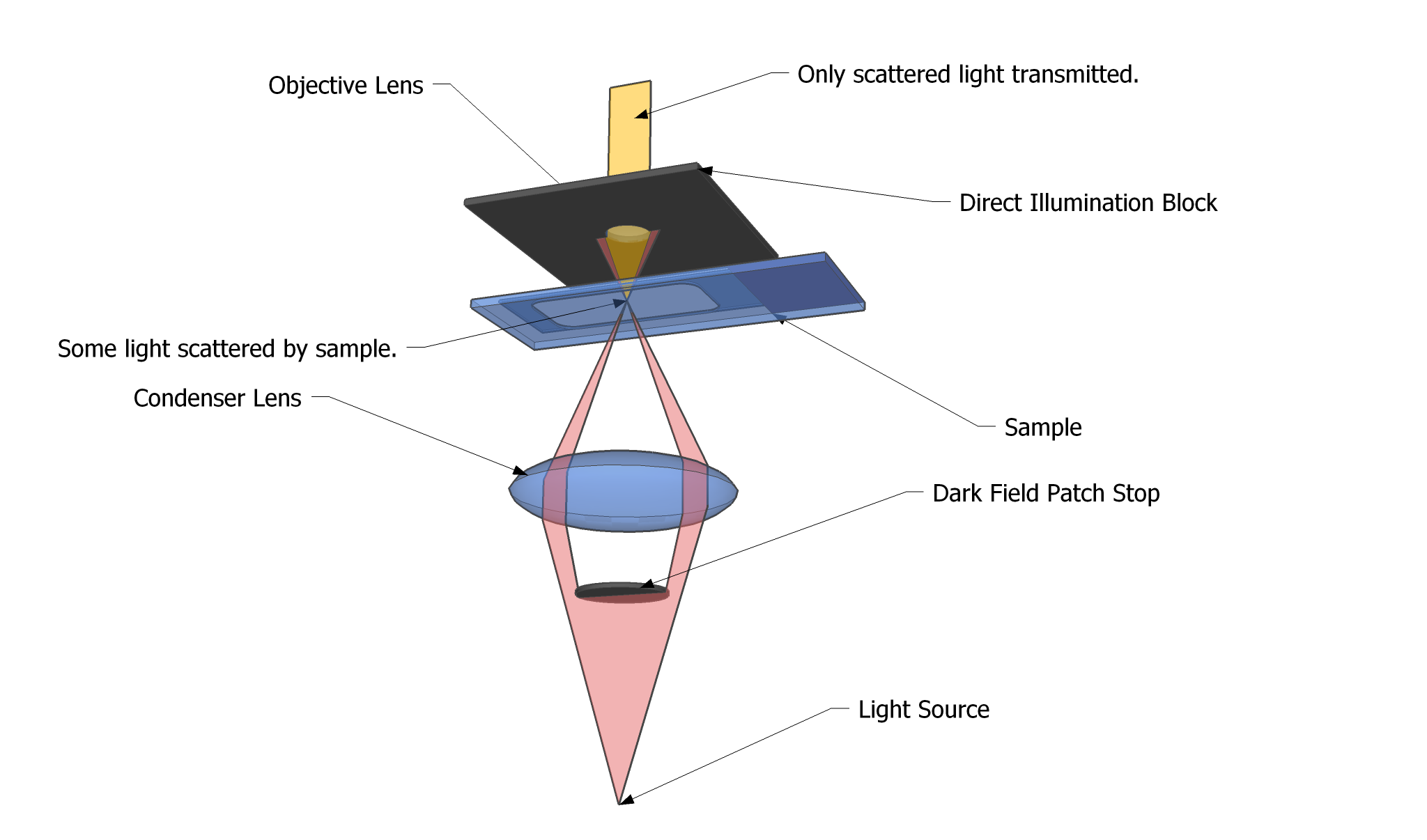
Diagram illustrating the light path through a dark-field microscope

The steps are illustrated in the figure where an inverted microscope is used.

1. Light enters the microscope for illumination of the sample.
2. A specially sized disc, the patch stop (see figure), blocks some light from the light source, leaving an outer ring of illumination. A wide phase annulus can also be reasonably substituted at low magnification.
3. The condenser lens focuses the light towards the sample.
4. The light enters the sample. Most is directly transmitted, while some is scattered from the sample.
5. The scattered light enters the objective lens, while the directly transmitted light simply misses the lens and is not collected due to a direct-illumination block (see figure).
6. Only the scattered light goes on to produce the image, while the directly transmitted light is omitted.

=== Advantages and disadvantages ===
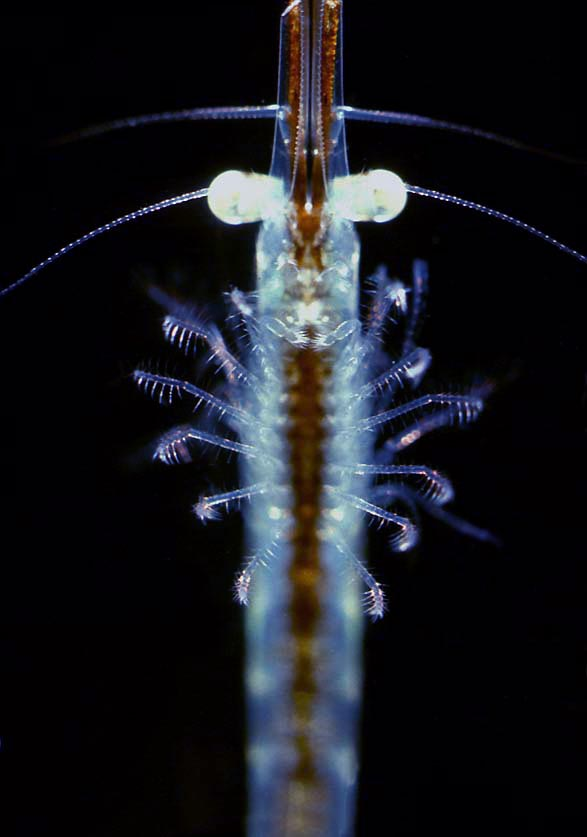
Dark-field microscopy produces an image with a dark background

Operating principles of dark-field and phase-contrast microscopies

Dark-field microscopy is a very simple yet effective technique and well suited for uses involving live and unstained biological samples, such as a smear from a tissue culture or individual, water-borne, single-celled organisms. Considering the simplicity of the setup, the quality of images obtained from this technique is impressive.

One limitation of dark-field microscopy is the low light levels seen in the final image. This means that the sample must be very strongly illuminated, which can cause damage to the sample.

Dark-field microscopy techniques are almost entirely free of halo or relief-style artifacts typical of differential interference contrast microscopy. This comes at the expense of sensitivity to phase information.

The interpretation of dark-field images must be done with great care, as common dark features of bright-field microscopy images may be invisible, and vice versa. In general the dark-field image lacks the low spatial frequencies associated with the bright-field image, making the image a high-passed version of the underlying structure.

While the dark-field image may first appear to be a negative of the bright-field image, different effects are visible in each. In bright-field microscopy, features are visible where either a shadow is cast on the surface by the incident light or a part of the surface is less reflective, possibly by the presence of pits or scratches. Raised features that are too smooth to cast shadows will not appear in bright-field images, but the light that reflects off the sides of the feature will be visible in the dark-field images.

Comparison of transillumination techniques used to generate contrast in a sample of tissue paper (1.559 μm/pixel when viewed at full resolution)

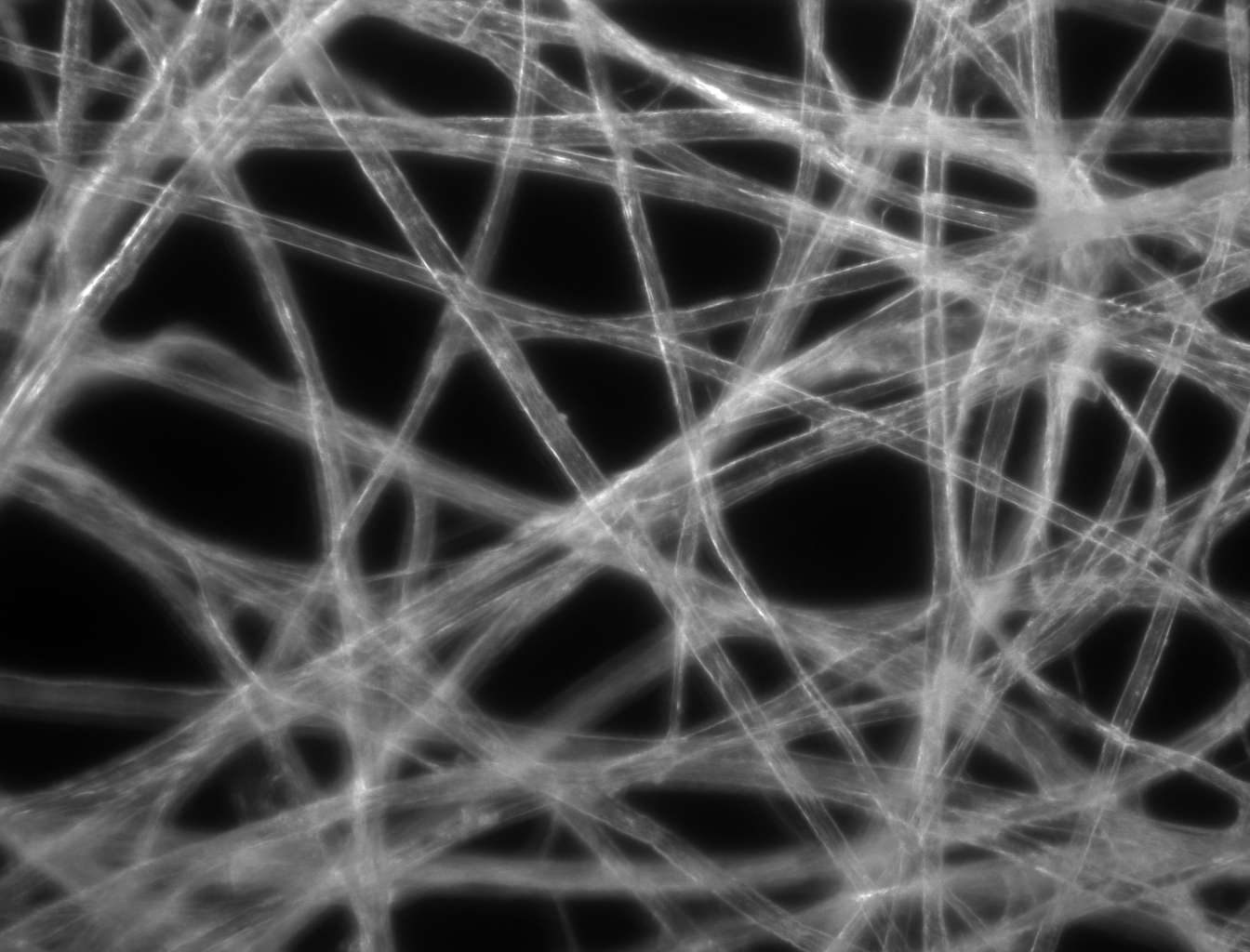
Dark-field illumination, sample contrast comes from light scattered by the sample

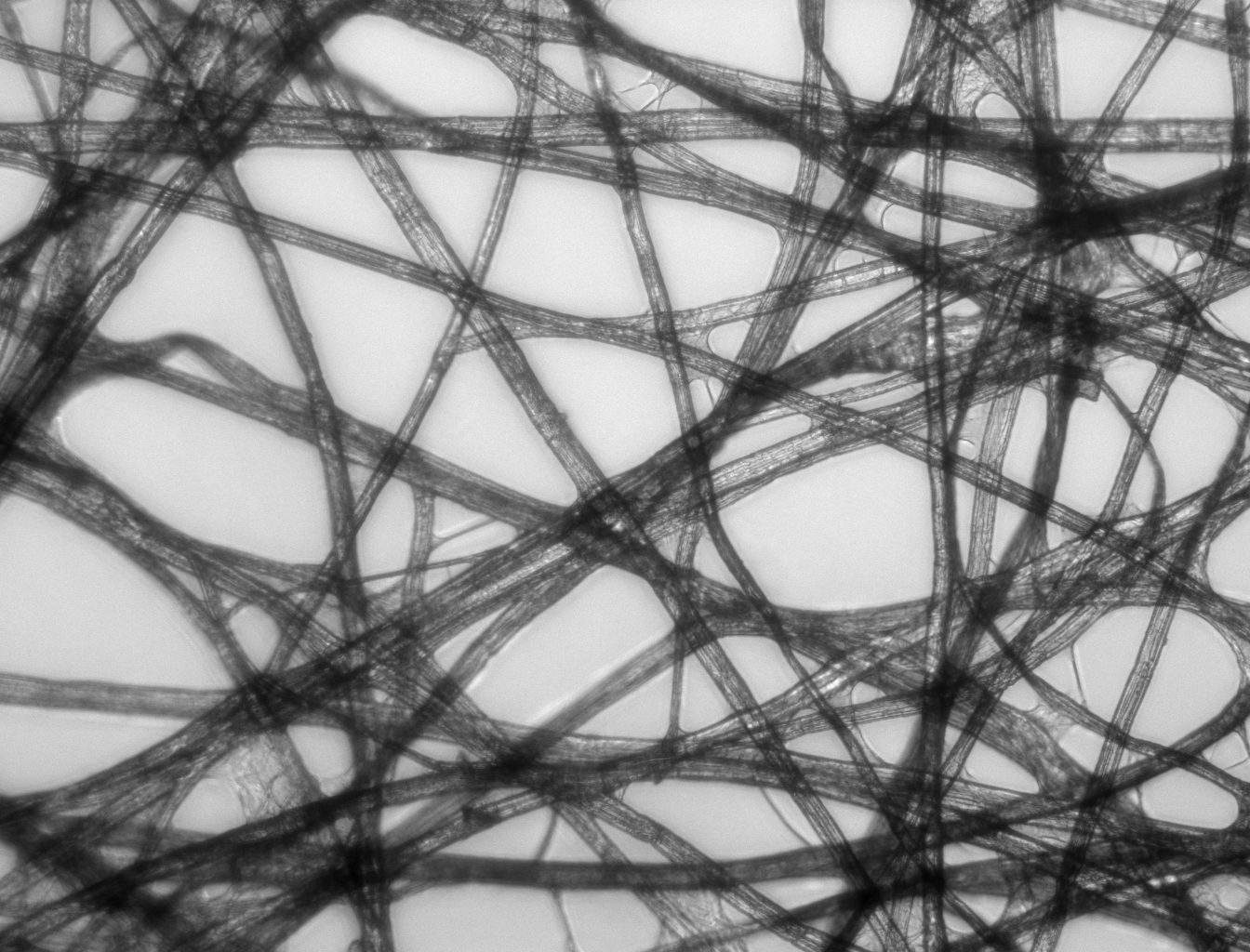
Bright-field illumination, sample contrast comes from attenuation of light in the sample

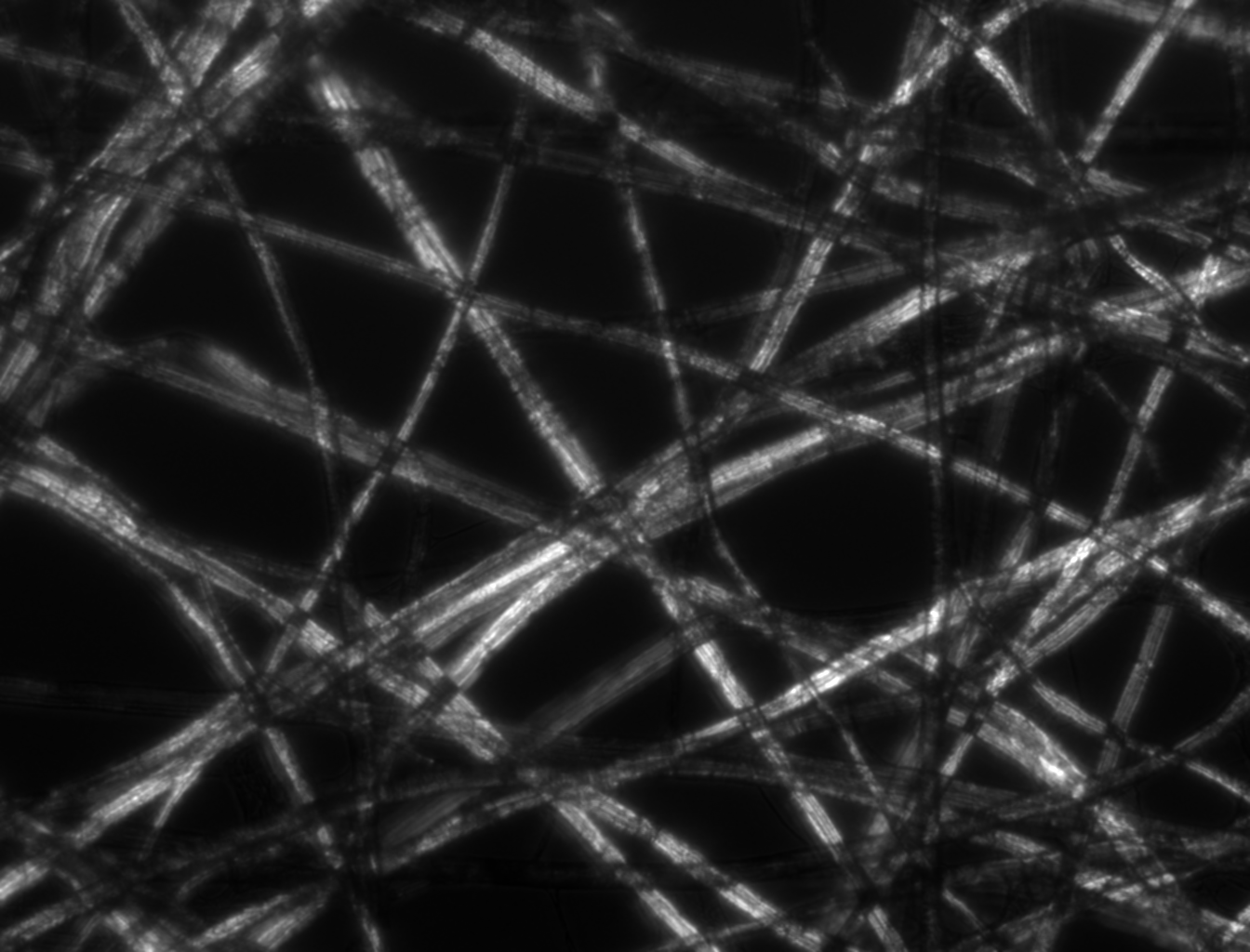
Cross-polarized light illumination, sample contrast comes from rotation of polarized light through the sample

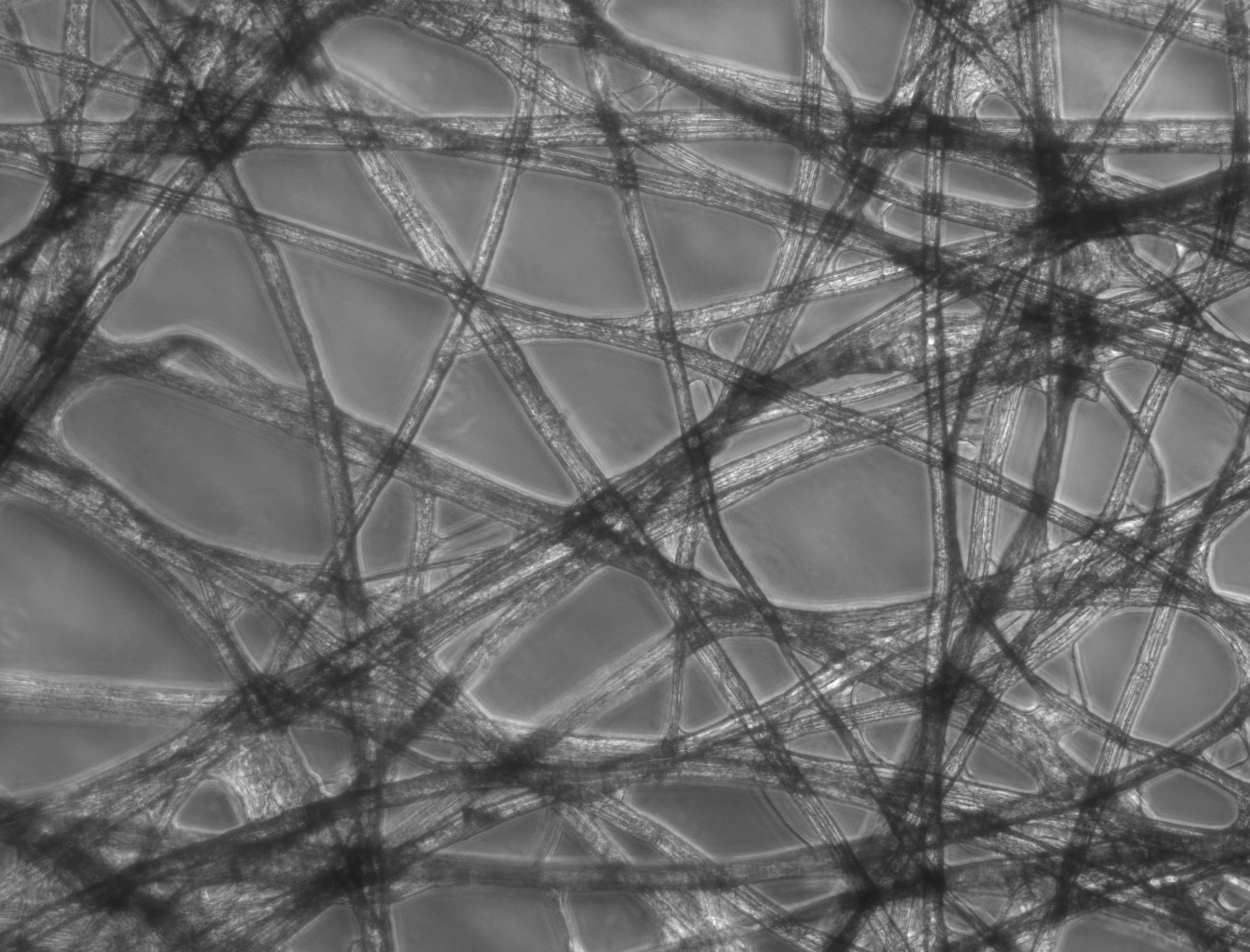
Phase-contrast illumination, sample contrast comes from interference of different path lengths of light through the sample

=== Use in computing ===
Dark-field microscopy has been applied in computer mouse pointing devices to allow the mouse to work on transparent glass by imaging microscopic flaws and dust on the glass's surface.

== Transmission electron microscope applications ==
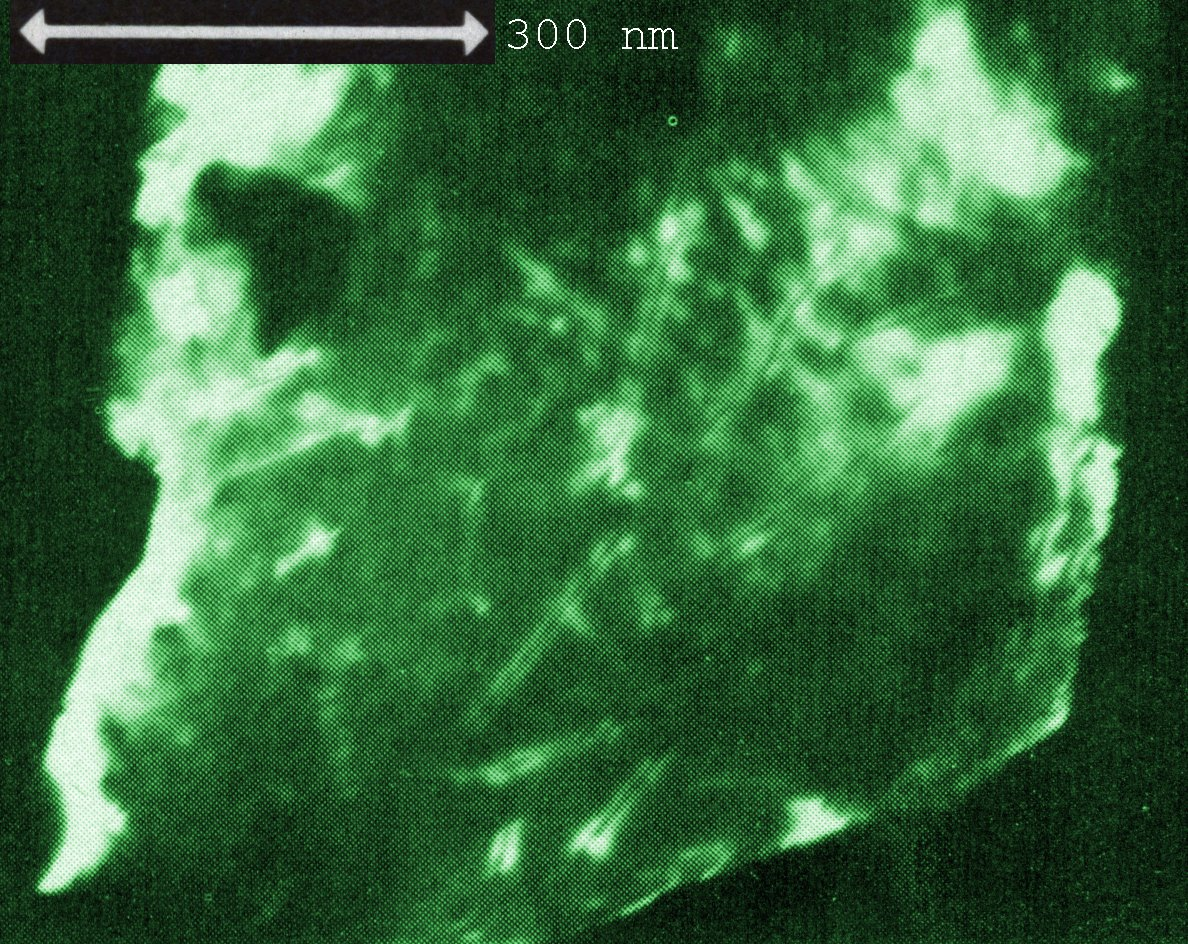
Weak-beam DF of strain around nuclear track cores

Dark-field studies in transmission electron microscopy play a role in the study of crystals and crystal defects, as well as in the imaging of individual atoms.

=== Conventional dark-field imaging ===
Briefly, imaging involves tilting the incident illumination until a diffracted, rather than the incident, beam passes through a small objective aperture in the objective lens back focal plane. Dark-field images, under these conditions, allow one to map the diffracted intensity coming from a single collection of diffracting planes as a function of projected position on the specimen and as a function of specimen tilt.

In single-crystal specimens, single-reflection dark-field images of a specimen tilted just off the Bragg condition allow one to "light up" only those lattice defects, like dislocations or precipitates, that bend a single set of lattice planes in their neighborhood. Analysis of intensities in such images may then be used to estimate the amount of that bending. In polycrystalline specimens, on the other hand, dark-field images serve to light up only that subset of crystals that are Bragg-reflecting at a given orientation.

Animation: dark-field imaging of crystals

Digital dark-field simulation of 2 nm metal particles on a nano-cylinder

This animation illustrates movement of an aperture (centered in the orange figure at left) over the power spectrum (a digital substitute for the back focal-plane's optical diffraction pattern) shown with the DC peak (or unscattered beam) below center. Only nanocrystals with projected periodicities that diffract into the aperture light up in the dark-field image at right. The aperture is moving by 1.25° increments around the ring associated with diffraction from gold 2.3 Å (111) lattice spacings.

=== Weak-beam imaging ===
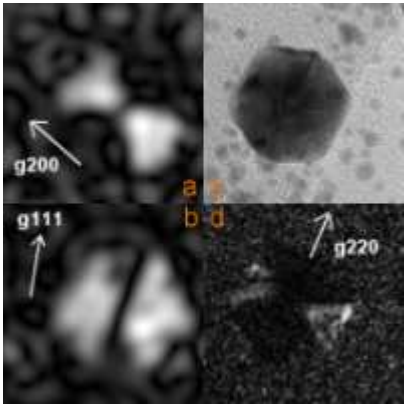
Digital dark-field image of internal twins

Weak-beam imaging involves optics similar to conventional dark-field, but uses a diffracted beam harmonic rather than the diffracted beam itself. In this way, much higher resolution of strained regions around defects can be obtained.

=== Low- and high-angle annular dark-field imaging ===
Annular dark-field imaging requires one to form images with electrons diffracted into an annular aperture centered on, but not including, the unscattered beam. For large scattering angles in a scanning transmission electron microscope, this is sometimes called Z-contrast imaging because of the enhanced scattering from high-atomic-number atoms.

=== Digital dark-field analysis ===
This a mathematical technique intermediate between direct and reciprocal (Fourier-transform) space for exploring images with well-defined periodicities, like electron microscope lattice-fringe images. As with analog dark-field imaging in a transmission electron microscope, it allows one to "light up" those objects in the field of view where periodicities of interest reside. Unlike analog dark-field imaging it may also allow one to map the Fourier-phase of periodicities, and hence phase gradients, which provide quantitative information on vector lattice strain.

== See also ==
- Annular dark-field imaging
- Light field microscopy
- Wavelets
