= Scanning confocal electron microscopy =

Scanning confocal electron microscopy (SCEM) is an electron microscopy technique analogous to scanning confocal optical microscopy (SCOM). In this technique, the studied sample is illuminated by a focussed electron beam, as in other scanning microscopy techniques, such as scanning transmission electron microscopy or scanning electron microscopy. However, in SCEM, the collection optics are arranged symmetrically to the illumination optics to gather only the electrons that pass the beam focus. This results in superior depth resolution of the imaging. The technique is relatively new and is being actively developed.

== History ==
The idea of SCEM logically follows from SCOM and thus is rather old. However, practical design and construction of scanning confocal electron microscope is a complex problem first solved by Nestor J. Zaluzec. His first scanning confocal electron microscope demonstrated the 3D properties of the SCEM, but have not realized the sub-nanometer lateral spatial resolution achievable with high-energy electrons (lateral resolution of only ~80 nm has been demonstrated). Several groups are currently working on construction of atomic resolution SCEM. In particular, atomically resolved SCEM images have already been obtained

== Operation ==
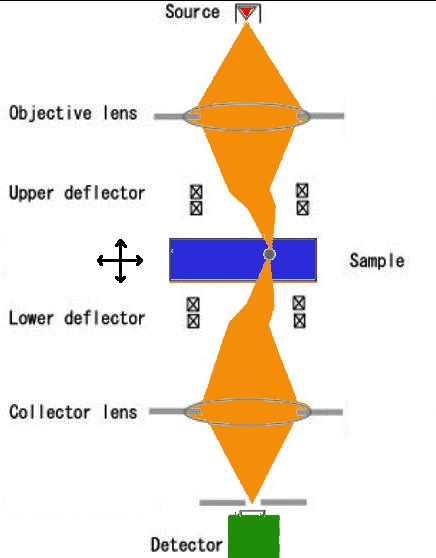
Schematic of SCEM

The sample is illuminated by a focused electron beam, and the beam is re-focused on the detector, thus collecting only electrons passing through the focus. In order to produce an image, the beam should be laterally scanned. In the original design, this was achieved by placing synchronized scanning and descanning deflectors. Such design is complex and only a few custom-built setups exist. Another approach is to use stationary illumination and collection, but perform scan by moving the sample with a high-precision piezo-controlled holder. Such holders are readily available and can fit into most commercial electron microscopes thereby realizing the SCEM mode. As a practical demonstration, atomically resolved SCEM images have been recorded.

== Advantages ==
High energies of incident particles (200 keV electrons vs. 2 eV photons) result in much higher spatial resolution of SCEM as compared to SCOM (lateral resolution <1 nm vs. >400 nm).

As compared to conventional electron microscopy (TEM, STEM, SEM), SCEM offers 3-dimensional imaging. 3D imaging in SCEM was expected from the confocal geometry of SCEM, and it has recently been confirmed by theoretical modeling. In particular, it is predicted that a heavy layer (gold) can be identified in light matrix (aluminum) with ~10 nm precision in depth; this depth resolution is limited by the convergence angle of the electron beam and could be improved to a few nanometers in next-generation electron microscopes equipped with two fifth-order spherical aberration correctors.

== See also ==
- Confocal microscopy
- Confocal laser scanning microscopy
- Electron microscopy
- Scanning electron microscope
- Scanning transmission electron microscopy
- Transmission electron microscopy
