= Fluctuation electron microscopy =

Fluctuation electron microscopy (FEM), originally called Variable Coherence Microscopy before decoherence effects in the sample rendered that naming moot, is a technique in electron microscopy that probes nanometer-scale or "medium-range" order in disordered materials. The first studies were performed on amorphous Si (Treacy and Gibson 1997) and later on hydrogenated amorphous silicon.
