= Allison Doerr =

American chemist and academic

Allison Doerr is the chief editor of the academic journal Nature Methods and an American chemist. She began working there in 2005 and was elevated to chief editor in 2018.

Doerr studied biology, music, and chemistry at Vassar College in Poughkeepsie, New York. Springer Nature She started her research career in the field of polymer chemistry while she was an undergraduate at Vassar. She also got her PhD in chemistry from Princeton University.

== Career ==
Doerr joined Nature Methods in 2005 and was promoted to editor-in-chief in 2018. She is the journal's specialist in biochemistry and chemical biology, including metabolomics, proteomics, and structural biology.

She oversees the Nature Methods journal and editorial staff in her capacity as Chief Editor, and she occasionally continues to work on papers related to structural biology and proteomics.
