= Electron energy loss spectroscopy =

Form of microscopy using an electron beam

Experimental electron energy loss spectrum, showing the major features: zero-loss peak, plasmon peaks and core loss edge.

Electron energy loss spectroscopy (EELS) is a form of electron microscopy in which a material is exposed to a beam of electrons with a known, narrow range of kinetic energies. Some of the electrons will undergo inelastic scattering, which means that they lose energy and have their paths slightly and randomly deflected. The amount of energy loss can be measured via an electron spectrometer and interpreted in terms of what caused the energy loss. Inelastic interactions include phonon excitations, inter- and intra-band transitions, plasmon excitations, inner shell ionizations, and Cherenkov radiation. The inner-shell ionizations are particularly useful for detecting the elemental components of a material. For example, one might find that a larger-than-expected number of electrons comes through the material with 285 eV less energy than they had when they entered the material. This is approximately the amount of energy needed to remove an inner-shell electron from a carbon atom, which can be taken as evidence that there is a significant amount of carbon present in the sample. With some care, and looking at a wide range of energy losses, one can determine the types of atoms, and the numbers of atoms of each type, being struck by the beam. The scattering angle (that is, the amount that the electron's path is deflected) can also be measured, giving information about the dispersion relation of whatever material excitation caused the inelastic scattering.

== History ==
The technique was developed by James Hillier and RF Baker in the mid-1940s but was not widely used over the next 50 years, only becoming more widespread in research in the 1990s due to advances in microscope instrumentation and vacuum technology. With modern instrumentation becoming widely available in laboratories worldwide, the technical and scientific developments from the mid-1990s have been rapid. The technique is able to take advantage of modern aberration-corrected probe forming systems to attain chemical resolved images with atomic resolution, while with a monochromated electron source and/or careful deconvolution the energy resolution can reach units of meV. This has enabled detailed measurements of the atomic and electronic properties of single columns of atoms, and in a few cases, of single atoms.

== Comparison with EDX ==
EELS is spoken of as being complementary to energy-dispersive x-ray spectroscopy (variously called EDX, EDS, XEDS, etc.), which is another common spectroscopy technique available on many electron microscopes. EDX excels at identifying the atomic composition of a material, is quite easy to use, and is particularly sensitive to heavier elements. EELS has historically been a more difficult technique but is in principle capable of measuring atomic composition, chemical bonding, valence and conduction band electronic properties, surface properties, and element-specific pair distance distribution functions. EELS tends to work best at relatively low atomic numbers, where the excitation edges tend to be sharp, well-defined, and at experimentally accessible energy losses (the signal being very weak beyond about 3 keV energy loss). EELS is perhaps best developed for the elements ranging from carbon through the 3d transition metals (from scandium to zinc). For carbon, an experienced spectroscopist can tell at a glance the differences between diamond, graphite, amorphous carbon, and "mineral" carbon (such as the carbon appearing in carbonates). The spectra of 3d transition metals can be analyzed to identify the oxidation states of the atoms. Cu(I), for instance, has a different so-called "white-line" intensity ratio than Cu(II) does. This ability to "fingerprint" different forms of the same element is a strong advantage of EELS over EDX. The difference is mainly due to the difference in energy resolution between the two techniques (~1 eV or better for EELS, perhaps a few tens of eV for EDX).

== Variants ==
Example of inner shell ionization edge (core loss) EELS data from La_{0.7}Sr_{0.3}MnO_{3}, acquired on a scanning transmission electron microscope.

There are several basic flavors of EELS, primarily classified by the geometry and by the kinetic energy of the incident electrons (typically measured in kiloelectron-volts, or keV). Probably the most common today is transmission EELS, in which the kinetic energies are typically 100 to 300 keV and the incident electrons pass entirely through the material sample. Usually this occurs in a transmission electron microscope (TEM), although some dedicated systems exist which enable extreme resolution in terms of energy and momentum transfer at the expense of spatial resolution. This approach is especially promising in the regime of low-energy reflection and scanning electron microscope (SEM)-based EELS, in which the lower incident beam energy means that energy filtering of both the source and scattered electrons can be done in smaller form-factors.

Other flavors include reflection EELS (including reflection high-energy electron energy-loss spectroscopy (RHEELS)), typically at 10 to 1 keV, and aloof EELS (sometimes called near-field EELS), in which the electron beam does not in fact strike the sample but instead interacts with it via the long-ranged Coulomb interaction. Aloof EELS is particularly sensitive to surface properties but is limited to very small energy losses such as those associated with surface plasmons or direct interband transitions, since core-loss information is not energetically possible.

Recently, there has been growing interest in the use of EELS in 1-30 keV scanning electron microscope systems (SEM-EELS). Pioneered by Hitachi and their SU-9000 Scanning Electron Microscope, in which they demonstrated reduced beam damage in lithiated materials due to the lower beam energy reducing knock-on damage, as well as elemental mapping. Most recently, scientists from MIT demonstrated that EELS is possible in standard, retrofitted SEMs in the 1-20 keV energy range. In this work, they noted additional advantages of strong 2D material and plasmonic coupling leading to dramatically improved acquisition times, as well as substantially reduced beam damage.

Within transmission EELS, the technique is further subdivided into valence EELS (which measures plasmons and interband transitions) and inner-shell ionization EELS (which provides much the same information as x-ray absorption spectroscopy, but from much smaller volumes of material). The dividing line between the two, while somewhat ill-defined, is in the vicinity of 50 eV energy loss.

Instrumental developments have opened up the ultra-low energy loss part of the EELS spectrum, enabling vibrational spectroscopy in the TEM. Both IR-active and non-IR-active vibrational modes are present in EELS. In 2025, ultra-low energy loss STEM-EELS was used to directly observe magnons propagating inside antiferromagnetic nanocrystals with nanometer spatial and millielectronvolt energy resolution, marking a new application of EELS to spin-wave excitations.

== EEL spectrum ==
The electron energy loss (EEL) spectrum (EELS spectrum is redundant) can be roughly split into two different regions: the low-loss spectrum (up until about 50 eV in energy loss) and the high-loss spectrum. The low-loss spectrum contains the zero-loss peak (signal from all the electrons which did not lose measurable energy) as well as the phonon and plasmon peaks, and contains information about the band structure and dielectric properties of the sample. It is also possible to resolve the energy spectrum in momentum to directly measure the band structure. The high-loss spectrum contains the ionisation edges that arise due to inner shell ionisations in the sample. These are characteristic to the species present in the sample, and as such can be used to obtain accurate information about the chemistry of a sample.

Typically, EEL spectra are susceptible to noise, especially for measurements of beam sensitive materials, such as polymers or biological specimen, requiring limited acquisition times. The two major noise contributions are Poisson noise arising from the quantized nature of the beam electrons and Gaussian distributed detector noise. As EEL spectra are usually measured on CCD or direct electron detectors, where multiple pixels of a pixel-column are summed to create a spectrum out of a 2D pixel array, the noise statistics of such spectra is altered compared to regular 2D images. Due to the image formation process, especially on scintillation-based CCD detectors, the Poisson noise is also heavily correlated by the detector.

Due to the energy distribution of the electron gun, typically a Schottky-type or cold field emission gun, and the point spread function of the detector, all measurements conducted in EELS appear convolved with both of the above-mentioned distributions. Without a specimen in the beam path, these blur contributions can be measured in EELS as the vacuum zero-loss peak. Since all features in an EEL spectrum of a specimen are measured with this vacuum zero-loss peak, its distribution is also observable in all features of the spectrum, limiting the energy resolution. Therefore, deconvolution has become a standard post-processing procedure in order to reduce the effect and sharpen the spectrum. Typical techniqes employed in EELS are the Fourier-ratio method and the Richardson-Lucy deconvolution algorithm (RLA), wherein the vacuum zero-loss peak serves as the deconvolution kernel. However, the success of deconvolution is limited by the noise of the spectrum, the signal strength, and the width of the vacuum zero-loss peak. Since convolution attenuates the higher frequency components of the spectrum, it is not trivial to recover these in view of a noise background induced by the different noise contributions. The Nyquist-Shannon theorem states that features can only be fully resolved if the sampling rate is at least twice the highest contributing frequency. Therefore, losing these higher frequency components of the original underlying loss-spectrum, due to noise, corresponds to a loss of finer features in the reconstruction. It is hence essential to include a suitable noise statistic into the deconvolution algorithm to recover as many higher frequencies as possible. Since the RLA is derived from the pure Poisson statistics, which only covers part of the real noise statistics faced in EELS, and is doomed to diverge after an unspecified number of iterations, it is apparent that more recent deconvolution methods accounting for this have an edge over the older procedures in terms of accuracy of the reconstruction.

== Thickness measurements ==
EELS allows quick and reliable measurement of local thickness in transmission electron microscopy. The most efficient procedure is the following:

- Measure the energy loss spectrum in the energy range about −5..200 eV (wider better). Such measurement is quick (milliseconds) and thus can be applied to materials normally unstable under electron beams.
- Analyse the spectrum: (i) extract zero-loss peak (ZLP) using standard routines; (ii) calculate integrals under the ZLP (I_{0}) and under the whole spectrum (I).
- The thickness t is calculated as mfp*ln(I/I_{0}). Here mfp is the mean free path of electron inelastic scattering, which has been tabulated for most elemental solids and oxides.

The spatial resolution of this procedure is limited by the plasmon localization and is about 1 nm, meaning that spatial thickness maps can be measured in scanning transmission electron microscopy with ~1 nm resolution.

== Pressure measurements ==
The intensity and position of low-energy EELS peaks are affected by pressure. This fact allows mapping local pressure with ~1 nm spatial resolution.

- Peak shift method is reliable and straightforward. The peak position is calibrated by independent (usually optical) measurement using a diamond anvil cell. However, the spectral resolution of most EEL spectrometers (0.3-2 eV, typically 1 eV) is often too crude for the small pressure-induced shifts. Therefore, the sensitivity and accuracy of this method is relatively poor. Nevertheless, pressures as small as 0.2 GPa inside helium bubbles in aluminum have been measured.
- Peak intensity method relies on pressure-induced change in the intensity of dipole-forbidden transitions. Because this intensity is zero for zero pressure the method is relatively sensitive and accurate. However, it requires existence of allowed and forbidden transitions of similar energies and thus is only applicable to specific systems, e.g., Xe bubbles in aluminum.

== Use in confocal geometry ==
Scanning confocal electron energy loss microscopy (SCEELM) is a new analytical microscopy tool that enables a double corrected transmission electron microscope to achieve sub-10 nm depth resolution in depth sectioning imaging of nanomaterials. It was previously termed as energy filtered scanning confocal electron microscopy due to the lack to full spectrum acquisition capability (only a small energy window on the order of 5 eV can be used at a time). SCEELM takes advantages of the newly developed chromatic aberration corrector which allows electrons of more than 100 eV of energy spread to be focused to roughly the same focal plane. It has been demonstrated that a simultaneous acquisition of the zero loss, low-loss, and core loss signals up to 400 eV in the confocal geometry with depth discrimination capability.

== See also ==
- Energy filtered transmission electron microscopy
- Magic angle (EELS)
- Transmission electron microscopy
- Scanning transmission electron microscopy
