= Energy filtered transmission electron microscopy =

Energy-filtered transmission electron microscopy (EFTEM) is a technique used in transmission electron microscopy, in which only electrons of particular kinetic energies are used to form the image or diffraction pattern. The technique can be used to aid chemical analysis of the sample in conjunction with complementary techniques such as electron crystallography.

== Principle ==
If a very thin sample is illuminated with a beam of high-energy electrons, then a majority of the electrons will pass unhindered through the sample but some will interact with the sample, being scattered elastically or inelastically (phonon scattering, plasmon scattering or inner shell ionisation). Inelastic scattering results in both a loss of energy and a change in momentum, which in the case of inner shell ionisation is characteristic of the element in the sample.

If the electron beam emerging from the sample is passed through a magnetic prism, then the flight path of the electrons will vary depending on their energy. This technique is used to form spectra in electron energy loss spectroscopy (EELS), but it is also possible to place an adjustable slit to allow only electrons with a certain range of energies through, and reform an image using these electrons on a detector.

The energy slit can be adjusted so as to only allow electrons which have not lost energy to pass through to form the image. This prevents inelastic scattering from contributing to the image, and hence produces an enhanced contrast image.

Adjusting the slit to only allow electrons which have lost a specific amount of energy can be used to obtain elementally sensitive images. As the ionisation signal is often significantly smaller than the background signal, it is normally necessary to obtain more than one image at varying energies to remove the background effect. The simplest method is known as the jump ratio technique, where an image recorded using electrons at the energy of the maximum of the absorption peak caused by a particular inner shell ionisation is divided by an image recorded just before the ionisation energy. It is often necessary to cross-correlate the images to compensate for relative drift of the sample between the two images.

Improved elemental maps can be obtained by taking a series of images, allowing quantitative analysis and improved accuracy of mapping where more than one element is involved. By taking a series of images, it is also possible to extract the EELS profile from particular features.

== See also ==
- Transmission electron microscopy
