= Field emission gun =

Type of electron gun

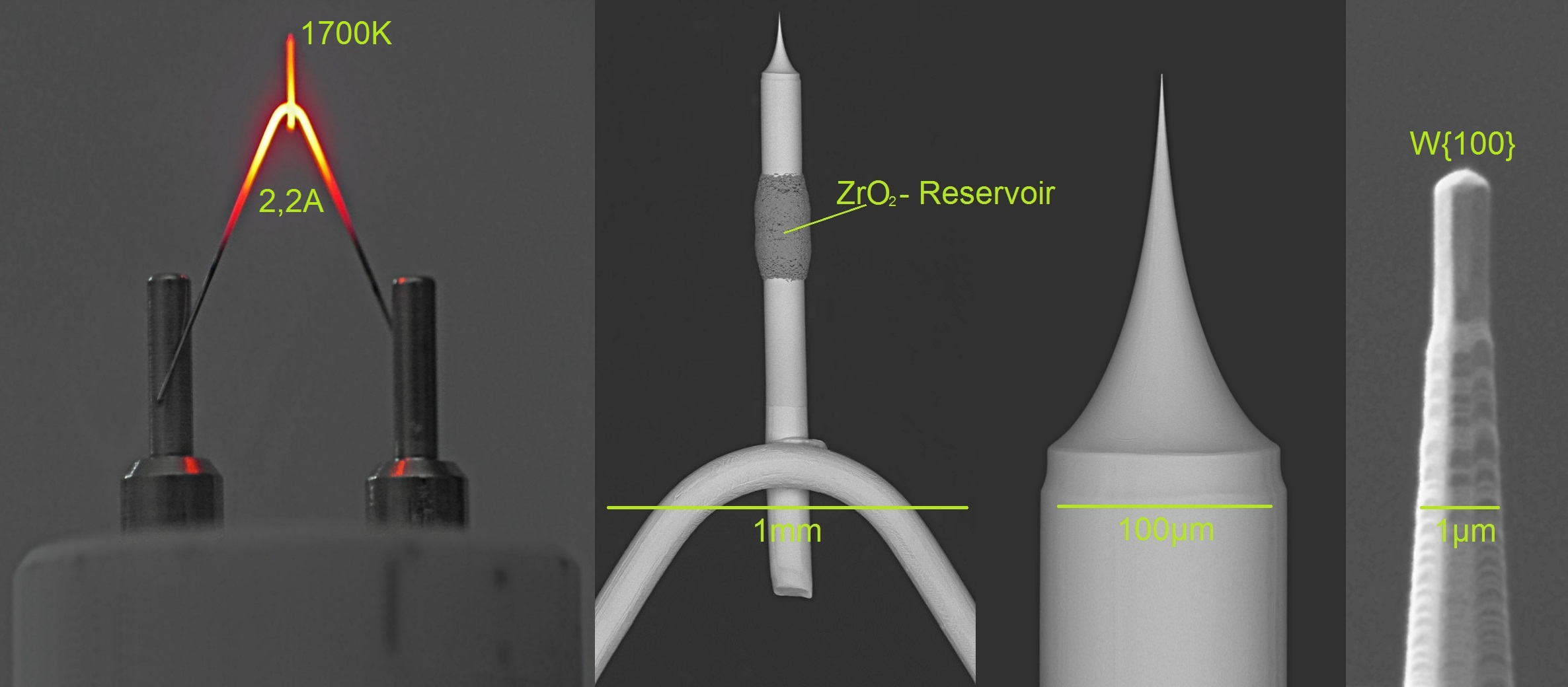
Schottky-emitter electron source of an Electron microscope

A field emission gun (FEG) is a type of electron gun in which a sharply pointed Müller-type emitter is held at several kilovolts negative potential relative to a nearby electrode, so that there is sufficient potential gradient at the emitter surface to cause field electron emission. Emitters are either of cold-cathode type, usually made of single crystal tungsten sharpened to a tip radius of about 100 nm, or of the Schottky type, in which thermionic emission is enhanced by barrier lowering in the presence of a high electric field. Schottky emitters are made by coating a tungsten tip with a layer of zirconium oxide (ZrO_{2}) decreasing the work function of the tip by approximately 2.7 eV.

In electron microscopes, a field emission gun is used to produce an electron beam that is smaller in diameter, more coherent and with up to three orders of magnitude greater current density or brightness than can be achieved with conventional thermionic emitters such as tungsten or lanthanum hexaboride (LaB_{6})-tipped filaments. The result in both scanning and transmission electron microscopy is significantly improved signal-to-noise ratio and spatial resolution, and greatly increased emitter life and reliability compared with thermionic devices.
