= Diagnostic electron microscopy =

The transmission electron microscope (TEM) is used as an important diagnostic tool to screen human tissues at high magnification and at high resolution (the ultrastructural level), often in conjunction with other methods, particularly light microscopy and immunofluorescence techniques. The TEM was first used extensively for this purpose in the 1980s, especially for identifying the markers of cell differentiation to identify tumours, and in renal disease. Immunolabelling techniques are now generally used instead of the TEM for tumour diagnosis but the technique retains a critical role in the diagnosis of renal disease and a range of other conditions. One example is Primary ciliary dyskinesia (PCD), a rare ciliopathy which affects the action of cilia. TEM images of ciliary axonemes are examined using TEM and abnormalities of structure can provide a positive diagnosis in some cases.

Specifically, TEM should be used for diagnostic purposes when it: (1) provides useful (complementary) information in the context of a carefully considered differential diagnosis; (2) provides an ‘improved’ diagnosis that results in better treatment strategies and; (3) is time & cost effective in respect to alternative techniques. For diagnostic purposes solid tissues are prepared for TEM in the same way as other biological tissues, they are fixed in glutaraldehyde and osmium tetroxide then dehydrated and embedded in epoxy resin. The epoxy resin block is trimmed and the target tissue is selected using a light microscope by viewing semithin sections stained with toluidine blue. The block is then retrimmed and the specific area for observation is ultrathin sectioned, preferably using a diamond knife. The ultrathin sections are collected on 3mm copper (mesh) grids and stained with uranyl acetate and lead citrate to make the contents of the tissue electron dense (and thus visible in the electron microscope).
