= Armin Delong =

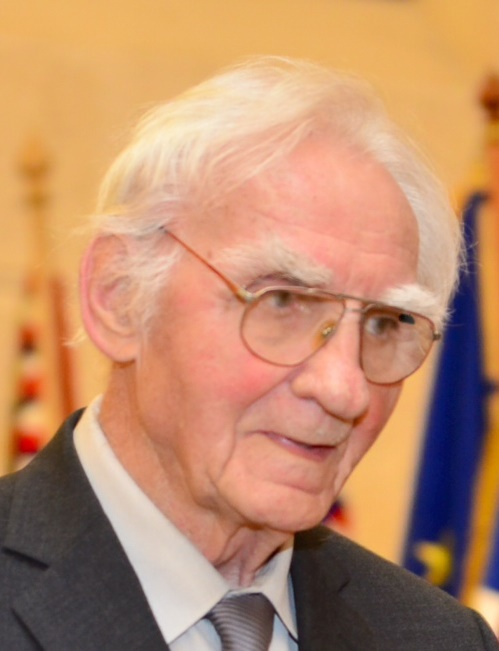
Armin Delong in 2014

Armin Delong (29 January 1925 – 5 October 2017) was a Czech physicist and a pioneer of electron microscopy in Czechoslovakia. Delong worked on electron microscopes that went into production at Tesla Brno. The team's BS 242 tabletop microscope won a gold medal at Expo 58 in Brussels. From 1961 to 1990, he was director of the Institute of Scientific Instruments of the Czechoslovak Academy of Sciences. His later work was focused on the development of compact low-voltage transmission electron microscopes.

Delong received the Czech government's Česká hlava award in 2005 and the Medal of Merit in 2015. From April to June 1990, he served as Deputy Prime Minister of Czechoslovakia with responsibility for scientific and technological development.

== Scientific career ==
Delong studied electrical engineering in Brno, graduating in 1950. While still a student, he joined the research group of Aleš Bláha, who proposed that the group build an electron microscope. Delong worked on the project with Vladimír Drahoš, Ladislav Zobač and other colleagues. The work led to the development of electron microscopes for manufacture by Tesla Brno. Among them was the BS 242 tabletop microscope, which won a gold medal at the 1958 Brussels World's Fair.

From 1961 to 1990, Delong directed the Institute of Scientific Instruments of the Czechoslovak Academy of Sciences in Brno. The institute developed electron microscopes that were manufactured by Tesla Brno, with Vladimír Drahoš heading its electron optics department. Delong and Drahoš contributed to the development of the Tesla BS-540 transmission electron microscope. One of these instruments was installed at Brno University of Technology in 1974, where it was used for materials research and teaching.

Delong continued his research at Delong Instruments, working with former students. His team developed the LVEM 5, a small transmission electron microscope that used an accelerating voltage of 5 kV. Biological samples could be examined without heavy-metal staining because the microscope produced higher image contrast at low voltage.
