= Photon-Induced Near-field Electron Microscopy =

Electron microscope technique

Photon-Induced Near-field Electron Microscopy (PINEM) is a variant of the Ultrafast Transmission Electron Microscopy technique and is based on the inelastic coupling between electrons and photons in presence of a surface or a nanostructure. This method allows one to investigate time-varying nanoscale electromagnetic fields in an electron microscope.

For visible light, such inelastic coupling between electrons and light, i.e. direct absorption or emission of photons, is forbidden in free space (vacuum) since it is not possible to simultaneously conserve both energy and momentum. This constraint can be circumvented when photon momentum is broadened as a result of light being reflected or scattered from a surface or nanostructure. This process would then generate evanescently confined near-fields with a broad momentum distribution, reaching high intensities in a nanoconfined space and thus also boosting the cross section of electron-light coupling.

Theoretically, the analytical description of the phenomenon has been provided by Park et al., Garcia de Abajo et al. and Feist et al. In these works the authors demonstrated that the strength of electron-light interaction depends on the linear coupling to the electric field projection along the electron propagation direction. In particular, Feist et al. also experimentally demonstrated that the interaction process results in a coherent spectral redistribution of the electron wave packet producing Rabi oscillations of a multi-level quantum ladder in which the states are separated by the photon energy.

For photonics application is the fact that the spectral, spatial and momentum distributions of the electrons subjected to such inelastic scattering process are strictly correlated with the near-field distribution mediating the electron-light coupling. The latter can be thus mapped in space and time with ultrafast electron microscopy methods, providing femtosecond movies of nanoscale fields in and around nanostructures.

The PINEM method can also be used to dynamically manipulate the wave properties of the electron beam by using suitably prepared electromagnetic field configuration. In such a way, one can modulate coherently the amplitude and phase of the electron beam along both the longitudinal and the transverse directions.

== See also ==
- Transmission electron microscopy
- Electron energy loss spectroscopy (EELS)
- Energy filtered transmission electron microscopy (EFTEM)
