= Low-voltage electron microscope =

A Low-voltage electron microscope (LVEM) is an electron microscope which operates in transmission mode at accelerating voltages of a few kiloelectronvolts (keV) or less. By contrast, high-voltage transmission electron microscopes use accelerating voltages in the range of 80-1000 keV.

While the architecture of these devices is very similar to a conventional transmission electron microscopes, they have a few key differences that enable them to take advantage of low voltage electron sources, but trading off many advantages of higher voltage operations, including higher resolution and the possibility of electron energy-loss spectroscopy (EELS), etc.

A representative example of this newer class of instruments is the LVEM 25E, a compact low-voltage transmission electron microscope that operates at accelerating voltages up to 25 kV. The LVEM 25E combines the high-contrast imaging advantages of low-voltage operation with improved penetration depth and analytical capability compared to earlier systems. In addition to TEM and STEM imaging modes, it integrates energy-dispersive X-ray spectroscopy (EDS), enabling elemental analysis of thin specimens. This extended voltage range allows the examination of biological and soft-matter samples with thicknesses approaching 100 nm, bridging the gap between traditional LVEM systems and conventional high-voltage TEMs.

An earlier, low cost alternative is the LVEM 5 tabletop low-voltage transmission electron microscope which operates at an accelerating voltage of approximately 5 kV. the LVEM5 is primarily used for very thin or particulate samples and does not support analytical techniques such as X-ray microanalysis or EELS. The instrument was developed by a team led by Armin Delong.

Low-voltage imaging using transmitted electrons is also possible in some modern scanning electron microscopes equipped with dedicated transmission detectors.

== Advantages ==
=== Higher contrast ===
A substantial reduction in electron energy allows for a significant improvement of contrast of light elements. The comparison images below show that decreasing the acceleration voltage from 80 kV to 5 kV significantly enhances the contrast of test samples. The improved contrast is a direct result of increased electron scattering associated with a reduced accelerating voltage.

LVEM brings an enhancement of imaging contrast nearly twenty times higher than for 100 kV. This may allow for better observation of biological specimens which are composed of light elements and do not exhibit sufficient contrast in classical TEMs.

Further, a relatively low mean free path (15 nm) for organic samples at 5 kV means that for samples with constant thickness, high contrast will be obtained from small variations in density. For example, for 5% contrast in the LVEM bright field image, we only need a difference in density between the phases of 0.07 g/cm^{3}. This means that the usual need to stain polymers for enhanced contrast in the TEM (typically done with osmium or ruthenium tetroxide) may not be necessary with the low voltage electron microscopy technique.

Comparison – TEM images of unstained thin section of rat heart
Low voltage (5 kV) image showing higher contrast

Conventional TEM (80 kV) image

=== Stain not required ===
The enhanced contrast achieved with low-voltage electron microscopy reduces or eliminates the need for traditional heavy-metal staining for imaging light elements such as hydrogen, carbon, nitrogen, oxygen, sulfur, and phosphorus.

While heavy-metal stains may still be used for applications requiring high-resolution structural information, LVEM allows the use of alternative or milder stains, minimizing potential sample disruption and reducing the risk of imaging artifacts.

Non-uranyl heavy-metal stains and alternatives that can be used include:

- Phosphotungstic acid (PTA) – commonly used for proteins, viruses, and other biological macromolecules.
- Osmium tetroxide (OsO_{4}) – often used for fixation and contrast enhancement of lipids and membranes.
- Ruthenium tetroxide (RuO_{4}) – applied for imaging membranes and polymers.
- Lanthanide salts (e.g., samarium, cerium) – used as safer alternatives in some polymer and biological staining protocols.

While heavy metal staining is beneficial for experiments aimed at high resolution structure determination, it is highly undesirable in certain protein sample preparations, because it could destabilize the protein sample due to its acid pH and relatively high heavy metal concentration. The addition of stain to sectioned samples such as biological materials or polymers can also introduce imaging artifacts.

LVEM experiments carried out on an extracted membrane protein sample that was analyzed with and without the staining procedure show a marked improvement in the appearance of the sample when standard staining is omitted. Results show that LVEM could be even more useful than conventional EM for this particular application because it avoids the potentially disrupting staining step, thus providing an undisturbed image of the protein's aggregation state.

Additionally, The ability to eliminate the staining step could aid to improve safety in the lab, as common heavy metal stains, such as uranyl acetate do have associated health risks.

=== Resolution ===
The first low-voltage electron microscopes were capable of spatial resolutions of about 2.5 nm in TEM, 2.0 nm in STEM, and 3.0 nm in SEM modes. TEM and STEM resolution has been improved in commercialized systems to 1.0nm in 2016. TEM resolutions as good as a 0.14 nm at 15 keV have been reported in 2016 for non-commercial systems.

=== Compact form factor and facility requirements ===
Low-voltage electron microscopes generally have a smaller physical footprint and reduced facility requirements compared with conventional high-voltage transmission electron microscopes. Operation at lower accelerating voltages reduces the need for large high-voltage power supplies, complex cooling infrastructure, and extensive radiation shielding.Certain low-voltage electron microscopes employ air-cooled lens systems incorporating permanent magnets, eliminating the requirement for water-cooling and reducing overall system complexity. As a result, many LVEM systems can be installed in standard laboratory environments without dedicated microscope suites, liquid nitrogen cooling, or specialized utilities. These characteristics simplify installation and operation and facilitate the use of transmission electron microscopy in laboratories with limited space or infrastructure

=== Accessibility ===
The reduced complexity and infrastructure requirements of low-voltage electron microscopes improve accessibility to transmission electron microscopy in a broader range of research and educational settings. Lower operating voltages, simplified installation, and reduced dependence on specialized facilities allow LVEM systems to be deployed in institutions that may lack the resources required for conventional high-voltage TEM laboratories. This has enabled wider adoption of transmission electron microscopy in teaching environments, smaller research laboratories, and institutions in regions with limited access to advanced microscopy infrastructure

== Limitations ==
Current commercially available low voltage microscopes are only able to obtain resolutions as low as 1 nm. While this is well beyond resolutions possible from optical (light) microscopes, they are not yet able to compete with the atomic resolution obtainable from higher voltage electron microscopes.

At certain levels, low-voltage an limit the maximum thickness of samples which can be studied in the TEM or STEM mode. For example, carbon based samples are recommended to be between 50–90 nm in HV-TEM. For LVEM at 25kV there is no need to change this, though at 5kV it decreases to around 20–65 nm. Carbon based samples can be sectioned to these thicknesses with the use of an ultramicrotome.

== See also ==
- Electron microscope
- Transmission electron microscope (TEM)
- High-resolution transmission electron microscopy (HRTEM)
- Scanning electron microscope (SEM)
- Scanning transmission electron microscope (STEM)
- Low-energy electron microscopy (LEEM)
- Electron diffraction
- Low-energy electron diffraction (LEED)

== Application areas ==
LVEM is especially efficient for the following applications.

- Antibodies
- Cell biology
- Drug discovery
- Education
- Histology
- Materials science
- Nanomedicine
- Nanoparticles
- Nanotubes
- Pathology
- Polymers
- Proteins
- Tissue samples
- Toxicology
- Viruses
