= Uranyl acetate =

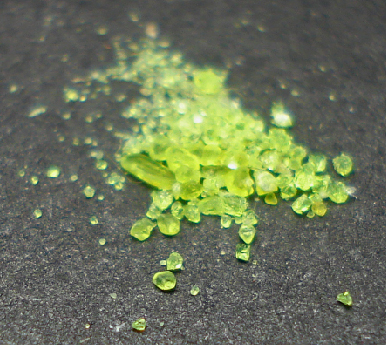
- Uranyl acetate
- UO_{2}(H_{2}O)^{2+}[CH_{3}CO^{−}_{2}]_{2} Hydrated crystal structure

Names
- IUPAC name Uranium bis((acetato)-O)dioxo-dihydrate
- Other names Uranyl ethanoate; Uranyl acetate dihydrate

Identifiers
CAS Number	(anhydrous): 541-09-3; (dihydrate): 6159-44-0
3D model (JSmol)	(anhydrous) ionic form (anhydrate): Interactive image; (dihydrate): Interactive image; coordination dimer (hydrate): Interactive image; coordination dimer (anhydrous): Interactive image
ChemSpider	(anhydrous): 10468551; (dihydrate): 11567664
ECHA InfoCard	100.007.971
EC Number	(anhydrous): 208-767-5
PubChem CID	(anhydrous): 10915
UNII	(anhydrous): 285PN2K1AO; (dihydrate): KJF3TEU4G6
CompTox Dashboard (EPA)	(anhydrous): DTXSID3060243
- InChI: (anhydrous): InChI=1S/2C2H4O2.2O.U/c2*1-2(3)4;;;/h2*1H3,(H,3,4);;; Key: IXSMFXMQHOBORU-UHFFFAOYSA-N; (dihydrate): InChI=1S/2C2H4O2.2H2O.2O.U/c2*1-2(3)4;;;;;/h2*1H3,(H,3,4);2*1H2;;;/q;;;;;;+2/p-2 Key: VVAHPLNXWRLLIG-UHFFFAOYSA-L
- SMILES: (anhydrous) ionic form (anhydrate): O=C(C)[O-].[O+]#[U]#[O+].O=C(C)[O-]; (dihydrate): CC(=O)[O-].CC(=O)[O-].O.O.O=[U+2]=O; coordination dimer (hydrate): O0[C-](C)O[U+6]01(=[O-2])(=[O-2])([OH2])O[C-](C)O[U+6]2(O[C-](C)O2)(=[O-2])(=[O-2])([OH2])O[C-](C)O1; coordination dimer (anhydrous): O0[C-](C)O[U+6]01(=[O-2])(=[O-2])O[C-](C)O[U+6]0(O[C-](C)O0)(=[O-2])(=[O-2])O[C-](C)O1

Properties
Chemical formula	UO_{2}(CH_{3}COO)_{2} (anhydrous); UO_{2}(CH_{3}COO)_{2}·2H_{2}O (dihydrate)
Molar mass	424.146 g/mol (dihydrate)
Appearance	yellow-green crystals (dihydrate)
Density	2.89 g/cm^{3} (dihydrate)
Melting point	decomposes at 80 °C (dihydrate)
Solubility in water	7-8 g/100 ml
Solubility	slightly soluble in ethanol

Hazards
- GHS labelling
Pictograms	(GHS06: Toxic) (GHS08: Health hazard) (GHS09: Environmental hazard)
Signal word	Danger
Hazard statements	H300, H330, H373, H411
Precautionary statements	P260, P264, P270, P271, P273, P284, P301+P310, P304+P340, P310, P314, P320, P321, P330, P391, P403+P233, P405, P501
Safety data sheet (SDS)	External MSDS
- Except where otherwise noted, data are given for materials in their standard state (at 25 °C [77 °F], 100 kPa). verify (what is ?) Infobox references

Uranyl acetate is the acetate salt of uranium oxide, a toxic yellow-green powder useful in certain laboratory tests. Structurally, it is a coordination polymer with formula UO_{2}(CH_{3}CO_{2})_{2}(H_{2}O)·H_{2}O.

== Structure ==
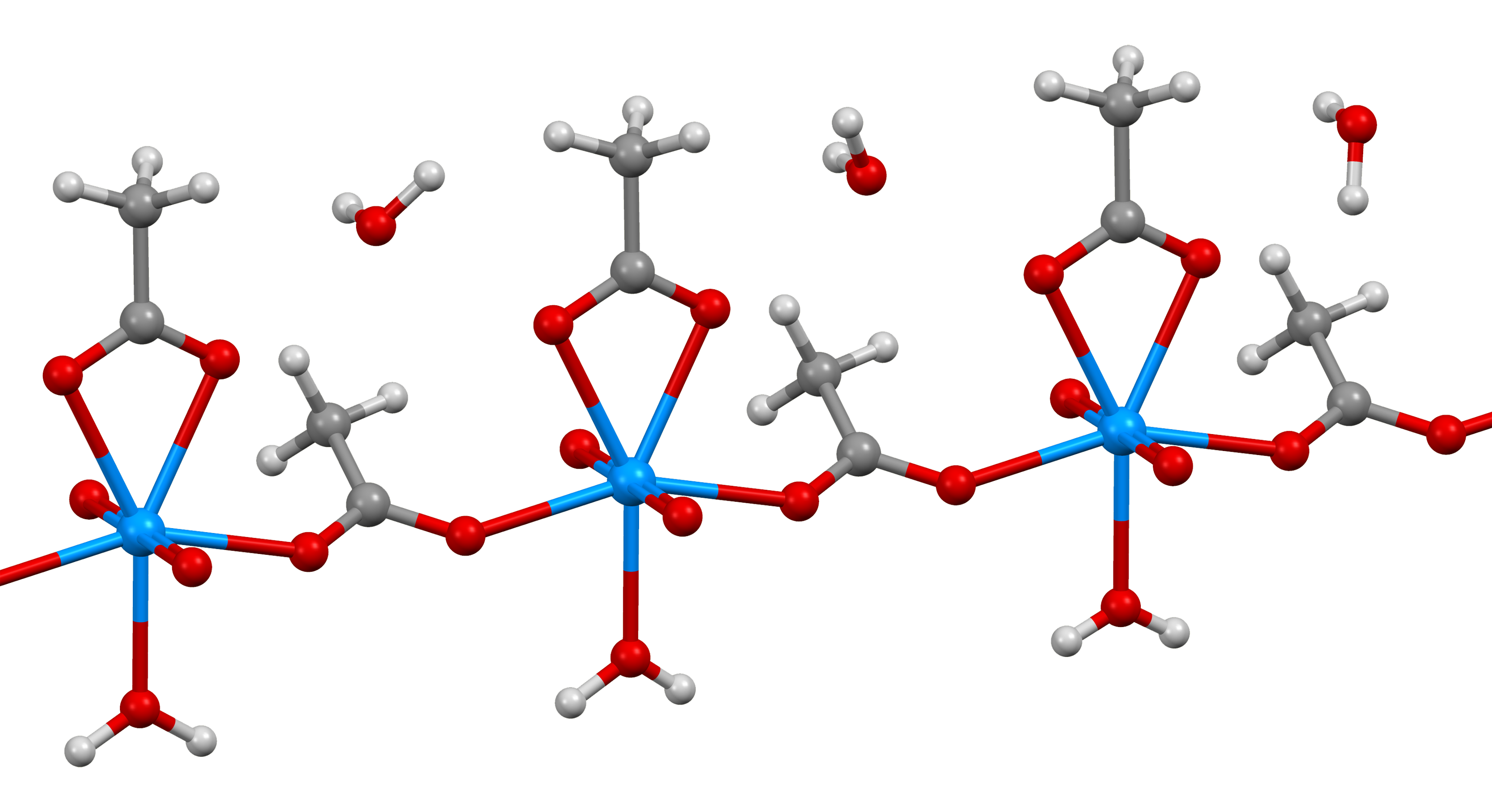
Structure (from X-ray crystallography) of uranyl acetate dihydrate. Color code: red = O, gray = C, blue = U.

In the polymer, uranyl (UO_{2}^{2+}) centers are bridged by acetate ligands. The remainder of each (heptacoordinate) coordination sphere is provided by an aquo ligand and a bidentate acetate ligand. One water of crystallization occupies the lattice.

Uranyl carboxylates are known for diverse carboxylic acids (formate, butyrate, acrylate).

== Uses ==
Uranyl acetate is extensively used as a negative stain in electron microscopy. Most procedures in electron microscopy for biology require the use of uranyl acetate. Negative staining protocols typically treat the sample with 1% to 5% aqueous solution. Uranyl acetate staining is simple and quick to perform and one can examine the sample within a few minutes after staining. Some biological samples are not amenable to uranyl acetate staining and, in these cases, alternative staining techniques and or low-voltage electron microscopy technique may be more suitable.

1% and 2% uranyl acetate solutions are used as an indicator, and a titrant in stronger concentrations in analytical chemistry, as it forms an insoluble salt with sodium (the vast majority of sodium salts are water-soluble). Uranyl acetate solutions show evidence of being sensitive to light, especially UV, and will precipitate if exposed.

Uranyl acetate is also used in a standard test—American Association of State Highway and Transportation Officials (AASHTO) Designation T 299—for alkali-silica reactivity in aggregates (crushed stone or gravel) being considered for use in cement concrete.

Uranyl acetate dihydrate has been used as a starting reagent in experimental inorganic chemistry.

== Preparation and reactions ==
The compound can be prepared by treating uranium trioxide with acetic acid:

UO_{3} + 2 CH_{3}COOH + H_{2}O → UO_{2}(CH_{3}COO)_{2}·2H_{2}O

The acetate ligands of uranyl acetate can be replaced to give a variety of uranyl complexes. Uranyl acetate can also be reduced by zinc to give the uranium(IV) acetate (U(OAc)_{4}).

== Safety ==
In general, uranium salts exhibit nephrotoxicity. Normal commercial stocks from depleted uranium have typical specific activity 0.37–0.51 microcuries per gram (14–19 kBq/g), too weak to harm from outside the body. However, uranyl acetate is very toxic if ingested, inhaled as dust, or absorbed through cut or abraded skin.

Microbiologists have developed a number of alternative stains: neodymium acetate, platinum blue, hafnium chloride, and oolong tea extracts.
