= Immune electron microscopy =

Variant of electron microscopy

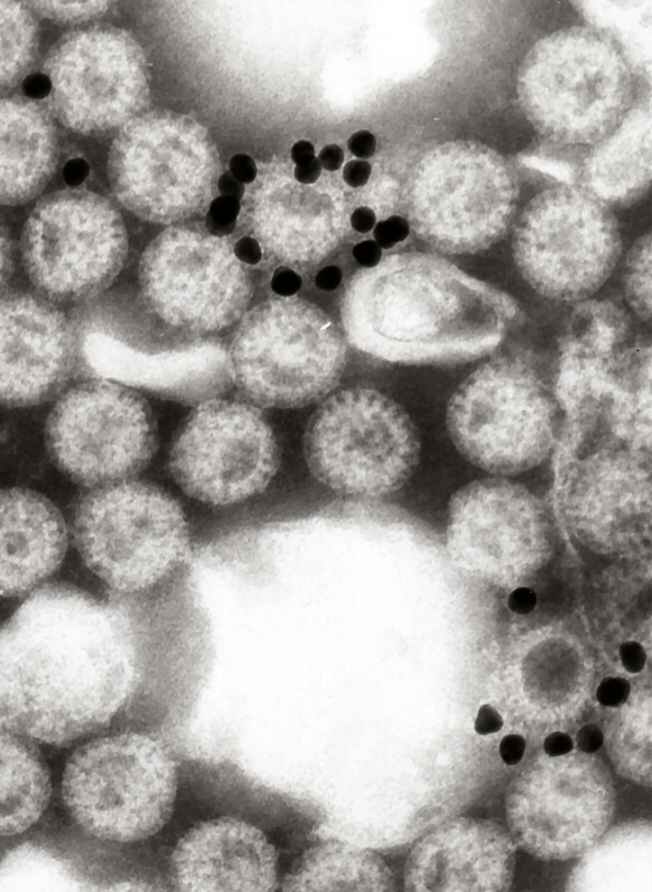
Electron micrograph of gold nanoparticles attached to rotaviruses. The small dark circular objects are gold nanoparticles coated with a monoclonal antibody specific for rotavirus protein VP6.

Immune electron microscopy (more often called immunoelectron microscopy) is the equivalent of immunofluorescence, but it uses electron microscopy rather than light microscopy. Immunoelectron microscopy identifies and localizes a molecule of interest, specifically a protein of interest, by attaching it to a particular antibody. This bond can form before or after embedding the cells into slides. A reaction occurs between the antigen and antibody, causing this label to become visible under the microscope. Scanning electron microscopy is a viable option if the antigen is on the surface of the cell, but transmission electron microscopy may be needed to see the label if the antigen is within the cell.

== Process ==
Antigens and their respective antibodies (usually two) interact in the section. Transmission electron microscopy then detects the antibody and, therefore, the protein. The second antibody is typically bound to gold because gold has a high atomic number, making it very dense. Colloidal gold particles make the antibodies visible by conjugating with them, because their exact diameter is known. When electrons pass through the microscope, they hit this gold particle. The dense gold atom reflects the electrons being emitted from the electron microscope and causes the appearance of the target particle within the specimen.

Another possible process involves Protein A, which is derived from a bacterium. It permanently coats the gold atom and binds to the constant region of the antibodies. This process uses Protein A as a replacement for the secondary and, consequently, only requires one antibody. Protein A makes the target protein visible. Thus, the entire process results in the localization and visualization of the target protein.

While using immune electron microscopy, the specimen can either be in thin sections so the electrons can penetrate it or negatively stained. Negative staining has higher resolution but can only identify molecules that would be recognizable if they are standing alone. When used in immune electron microscopy, negative staining implants a small particle into the specimen, better resolving structures within it. The benefit of immunoelectron microscopy is that it allows for the recognition of particles no matter the context.

== Complications and Results ==
=== Potential Complications ===
The sections under the microscope must be very thin to allow the electrons to pass through. Some complications can arise during the preparation steps necessary to create the thin sections, including chemical fixation and embedding (usually in plastic). These harsh preparations can denature antigens, interrupting their necessary bond with the antibodies. Researchers have invented and utilized specific processes to circumvent these issues and preserve the interaction between the antigen and antibodies. These methods include light fixation rather than chemical fixation, freezing the specimen prior to sectioning it, and incubating it at room temperature rather than high temperatures.

Bonds between antibodies and their respective antigen or between antibodies and their gold labels may be only partially secure due to the effects of low concentrations or steric hindrance on binding. Control groups are essential to account for the amount of labeling that occurs naturally without a virus.

=== Results ===
Results from immune electron microscopy are typically quantified visually. The sample must have certain features for quantitative analysis to be effective, limiting its frequency of use. It is applicable in situations like seeing how many colloidal gold particles are attached to a particular antibody. During successful experiments, immune electron microscopy can accurately locate proteins and strengthen comprehension of the relationship between structure and function. These processes in labeling and localization help researchers understand various cellular pathways and processes.

EM fixation and embedment protocols strongly affect the immune complexing outcomes: many fixation and processing procedures of electron microscopy such as the dehydration series leading to polymerization in plastic Epon, or glutaraldehyde-formaldehyde crosslinking of proteins, do not allow binding of an antibody to its former target. In one paper it was shown that the maintenance of active binding sites, through a gentle EM fixation and embedment procedure, revealed that cytoplasmic transport previously believed to occur via microvesicles were actually a preparation artifact, arising from a peroxidase-labelled antibody used before fixation: direct immunogold labeling in Lowicryl EM sections showed cytoplasmic transport without vesicles in ovarian tissues. .

1987:216A:395-401. Adv Exp Med Biol \1987:216A:395-401. doi: 10.1007/978-1-4684-5344-7_45.

== History ==
In 1931, Ernst Ruska (1986 Nobel Prize award winner) and Max Knoll created the first electron microscope. This invention led to the scanning electron microscope and transmission electron microscope, which later contributed to immunoelectron microscopy. At first, technology only allowed for two-dimensional images, but now with modern technology, three-dimensional images are also available.

Immunoelectron microscopy came about when two independent groups in the 1940s combined the tobacco mosaic virus and its antiserum. They then examined it under an electron microscope. At this time, resolution was much poorer due to a lack of additional contrast and poor quality microscopes of the day. The particles used in the experiment were known to be rod-shaped, and both groups of researchers found these rods clumping together in a group about twice their original size. More than a decade and a half later, researchers began to use singular antibodies attached to viruses. Finally, in 1962, negatively stained antibodies came out.

== Applications ==
=== Viruses ===
Transmission electron microscopy successfully provides general information about structure but struggles to differentiate more detailed parts of a virus or cell. Immunoelectron microscopy assists with the ability to diagnose viral infections and locate viral antigens in vaccines. Immunoelectron microscopy can sufficiently diagnose diseases and identify pathogens. One example is its ability to depict myelin destruction on the basement membrane. This damage can be associated with slower nerve impulses, resulting in an extensive range of cognitive and physical issues. Another example includes the identification of cutaneous lesions. In this case, scientists discovered insufficient anchoring fibrils in the basement membrane, which caused the skin to be more fragile. In both instances, scientists identified a specific antigen to target in order to use immune electron microscopy to discover and learn more about these diseases.

=== Renal Biopsies ===
Initially, renal biopsies used immunofluorescence microscopy, which provided lower resolution than immunoelectron microscopy. Before switching from light microscopy to electron microscopy, the results showed numerous biopsies calling for additional electron microscopy to ensure a more accurate diagnosis. The additional use of immunoelectron microscopy occurred both to make the initial diagnosis and to confirm the findings of the light microscopy. Scientists decided to complete a research study on the effectiveness of each type of microscopy. In many cases using only light microscopy, physicians could not make an initial diagnosis. A few even had incorrect diagnoses. The type of diagnosis also played a crucial role in the experiment. Fluorescence light microscopy accurately identified some diagnoses with no need to follow up. Others were much more difficult to differentiate and needed electron microscopy. Even in the patients where immunofluorescence microscopy yielded the correct results, researchers still believed confirmation was needed. The results of this study demonstrated the need to switch from light microscopy to electron microscopy for renal biopsy diagnosis.
