= TKD (disambiguation) =

TKD is an abbreviation of Taekwondo, a Korean martial art.

TKD may also refer to:

- tkd, the ISO 639-3 code for Tokodede language
- Takoradi Airport, the IATA code TKD
- Tughlakabad railway station, the station code TKD
- The Klingon Dictionary, a book by Marc Okrand describing the Klingon language
- Transmission Kikuchi diffraction, a method for orientation mapping at the nanoscale
- Centrale voor Textiel, Kleding en Diamant, a trade union representing workers in various industries in Belgium
- TKD (hate symbol), an online acronym for "Total Kike Death"
