= In situ electron microscopy =

In situ electron microscopy is an investigatory technique where an electron microscope is used to watch a sample's response to a stimulus in real time. Due to the nature of the high-energy beam of electrons used to image a sample in an electron microscope, microscopists have long observed that specimens are routinely changed or damaged by the electron beam. Starting in the 1960s, and using transmission electron microscopes (TEMs), scientists made deliberate attempts to modify materials while the sample was in the specimen chamber, and to capture images through time of the induced damages.

Also in the 1960s, materials scientists using TEMs began to study the response of electron-transparent metal samples to irradiation by the electron beam. This was in order to understand more about metal fatigue during aviation and space flight. The experiments were performed on instruments with high accelerating voltages; the image resolution was low compared to the sub-nanometer resolution available with modern TEMs.

Improvements in electron microscopy from the 1960s onwards focused on increasing the spatial resolution. This required increased stability for the entire imaging platform, but particularly for the area around the specimen stage. Improved image-capture systems using charge-coupled device cameras and advances in specimen stages coupled with the higher resolution led to creating systems devoted to applying stimuli to samples in specialized holders, and capturing multiple frames or videos of the samples' responses.

In addition to materials samples, in situ electron microscopy is performed on biological specimens, and is used to conduct experiments involving mechanical, chemical, thermal, and electrical responses. Early experiments mostly used TEMs, because the image is captured in a single frame, whereas the scanning electron microscope must move or scan across the sample while the stimuli is being applied, altering the sample.

Environmental cells expand the capabilities of in-situ electron microscopy by allowing materials to be imaged while exposed to controlled liquid, gas, or corrosive environments. In liquid-cell TEM, a very thin electrolyte layer is confined between electron-transparent membranes, making it possible to track processes such as dissolution, deposition, passivation, and early-stage pitting as they occur in solution. Closed liquid-cell platforms—for example, those produced by Protochips or Bruker—use silicon nitride microchips to maintain a sealed liquid environment while keeping the microscope column under high vacuum. Gas-cell TEM applies a similar approach using sealed microreactors that deliver dry or reactive gases (such as oxygen, hydrogen, or water vapor) to the sample at controlled temperatures and pressures. Commercial systems, including those developed by Protochips and Waviks, support switching between dry gas, reactive mixtures, and humidified environments. This enables direct observation of oxidation, reduction, catalysis, and environmentally driven degradation under conditions that more closely resemble real operating environments.

In addition to chemical environments, mechanical loading can be applied inside the microscope using actuated holders. Systems such as the Hysitron PI series allow for nanoindentation or compression testing during imaging, providing insight into deformation behavior, fracture processes, and irradiation-induced hardening at small scales. Collectively, liquid, gas, and mechanically actuated environmental cells allow real-time tracking of microstructural evolution, chemical reactions, and corrosion processes with nanometer-level spatial resolution.

Early problems that limited in situ electron microscopy includes: The sample must be electron transparent same as in TEM. Thick samples gives multiple scattering of higher energy electron with lower wavelength. This causes a loss of coherent signal which is required for diffraction and imaging. Mechanical vibration at all scales (from the microscope itself to the sample), and thermal and electrical interference, particularly at the specimen holder. These problems all required fast capture times. However a fast capture time creates an image with a low signal-to-noise ratio, limits the resolution of the image, and also limits the amount of time available for conducting the experiment. Higher vacuum conditions such as 10^-7 limits the in-situ and operando condition requirements.

Further limitations with in situ electron microscopy rely on temporal resolution. The temporal resolution of in situ TEM imaging cannot capture dynamic surfaces moving faster than its time scale. Some transient sites can transform on the scale of nanoseconds, which is 6-8 orders of magnitude higher than the microsecond resolution scale common to most in-situ TEMs. This can lead to transient conditions being blurred or missed entirely.

== Sources ==
- Behar, V.(2005). Applications of a Novel SEM Technique for the Analysis of Hydrated Samples. Microscopy and analysis,19 (4):9-11.
- Chai, C. (2012). Graphene liquid cells facilitate electron microscopy studies of nano crystal formation. Nanomaterials and Nanotechnology,4,11-14
- Chen, J., Badioli, M., Gonzalez, P., Thongrattanasiri, S., Huth, F., Osmond, J., Spasenovic, M., Centeno, A., Pesquera, A., Godignon, P., Elorza, A., *Camara, N., de Abajo, F., Hillenbrand, R. & Koppens, F.(2012). Optical nano-imaging of gate-tunable grapheme plasmons. Nature, 487, 77- 81.
- Dyab, A.k.F. & Paunov, V.N.(2010). Particle stabilised emulsions studied by WETSEM technique. Soft Matter, 6, 2613–2615.
- Ferreira, P.J., Stach, E., and Mitsuishi, K.(2008). “In-situ transmission electron microscopy”, MRS Bulletin, Volume 33, No.2.
- Gileadi, O. & Sabban, A.(2003). Squid sperm to clam eggs: imaging wet samples in a scanning electron microscope. Biol. Bull. 205: 177–179.
- Gubta, B. L., & Berriduge, M. J. (1966) A coat of repeating subunit on the cytoplasmic surface of the plasma membrane in the recital papillae of the blowfly calliphora erythrocephala (MEIG), study in situ by electron microscopy. Brief notes. 376–382.
- Han, Z., & Porter, A. E. (2020). In situ Electron Microscopy of Complex Biological and Nanoscale Systems: Challenges and Opportunities. Frontiers in Nanotechnology, 2. doi.org/10.3389/fnano.2020.606253
- Ju, L., Geng, B., Horng, B., Girit, C., Martin, M., Hao, Z., Bechtel, H., Liang, X., Zettl, A., Shen, R.,& Wang, F.(2011). Graphene plasmonics for tunable terahertz metamaterials. Nature Nanotechnol, 6, 630–634 .
- Kamari, Y., Cohen, H., Shaish, A., Bitzur, R., Afek, A., Shen, S., Vainshtein, A., and Harats, D.(2008). Characterisation of atherosclerotic lesions with scanning electron microscopy (SEM) of wet tissue. Diabetes and vascular disease research, 5(1): 44–47.
- Katz, A., Bentur, A., and Kovler, K.(2007). A novel system for in-situ observations of early hydration reactions in wet conditions in conventional SEM. Cement and Concrete Research 37, 32–37.
- Kolmakova, N. & Kolmakov, A.(2010). Scanning electron microscopy for in situ monitoring of semiconductor-liquid interfacial processes: electron assisted reduction of Ag ions from aqueous solution on the surface of TiO2 rutile nanowire. J. Phys. Chem. 114, 17233–17237.
- Stoll, J.D., Kolmakov A. (2012) Electron transparent graphene windows for environmental scanning electron microscopy in liquids and dense gases. Nanotechnology 23, 50, 505704.
- Al-Asadi, Ahmed S., Zhang, J., Li, J., Potyrailo, R.A., Kolmakov, A. (2015). Design and Application of Variable Temperature Setup for Scanning Electron Microscopy in Gases and Liquids at Ambient Conditions. Microscopy and Microanalysis 21 (3),765-770.
- Liu, X. H., Wang, J. W., Liu, Y., Zheng, H., Kushima, A., Huang, S., Zhu, T., Mao, S. X., Li, J., Zhang, Sulin, Z., Lu, W., Tour, J. M., & Huang, J. Y. (2012). In situ transmission electron microscopy of electrochemical lithiation, delithiation and deformation of individual graphene nanoribbons. J, Carbon 50. 3836–3844.
- Mao, S., Lu, G., & Chen, J.(2009). Carbon-nanotube-assisted transmission electron microscopy characterization of aerosol nanoparticles. Aerosol Science, 40, 180–184..
- Nyska, A, Cummings, C.A., Vainshtein, A., Nadler, J., Ezov, N., Grunfeld, Y., Gileadi, O. and Behar, V.(2004). Electron microscopy of wet tissues: A case study in renal pathology. Toxicologic Pathology, 32:357–363.
- Odahara, G., Otani, S., Oshima, C., Suzuki, M., Yasue, T. & Koshikawa, T.(2011). In-situ observation of graphene growth on Ni (111). Surface Science 605, 1095–1098.
- Petkov, N.(2013). In situ real-time TEM reveals growth, transformation and function in one-dimensional nanoscale materials: from a nanotechnology perspective. J, ISRN Nanotechnology. (2013) 21.
- Pocza, J. F., Barna, A., & Barna, B. (1969) Formation processes of vacuum –deposited indium films and thermodynamical properties of submicroscopic particles observed by in situ electron microscopy. J, Vacuum science & technology archives. (6) 4.
- QuantomiX Ltd. 2005 Quantomix.com domain name is for sale. Inquire now.
- Ruach-Nir, I., Zrihan, O., and Tzabari, Y.(2006). A capsule for dynamic in-situ studies of hydration processes by conventional SEM. Microscopy and Analysis, 20(4):19-21.
- Takayanagi, K., Yagi, K., Kobagashi, K. & Honjo, G. (1978) Techniques for routine UHV in situ electron microscopy of growth processes of epitaxial thin films. J, Phys. E: Sci. Instrument. (11) 441–448.
- Thiberge, S.(2004). An apparatus for imaging liquids, cells, and other wet samples in the scanning electron microscopy. Rev. Sci. Instrum., 75,2280-2289.
- Torres, E. A., & Ramı´rez, A. J. (2011) In situ scanning electron microscopy. J, Science and technology of welding and joining. 16(1)68-78.
- Wei, T., Luo, G., Fan, Z., Zheng, C., Yan, J., Yao, C., Li, W., & Zhang, C. (2009) Preparation of graphene nanosheet/polymer composites using in situ reduction–extractive dispersion. J, Carbon 47. 2290–2299.
- Ye, G., Breugel, B., Stroeven, P. (2002) Characterization of the development of microstructure and porosity of cement-based materials by numerical simulation and ESEM image analysis, Materials and Structures 35 (254) : 603–613.
- Yuk, J., Park, J., Ercius, P., Kim, K., Hellebusch, J., Crommie, F., Lee, J., Zettl, A. & Paul, A. (2013). High-resolution transmission electron microscopy observation of colloidal nanocrystal growth mechanisms using graphene liquid cells. Lawrence Berkeley National Laboratory.
- de Jonge, N., and F. M. Ross. “Electron Microscopy of Specimens in Liquid.” Nature Nanotechnology, vol. 6, no. 11, 2011, pp. 695–704.
- Yuk, J. M., et al. “High-Resolution EM of Colloidal Nanocrystal Growth in Liquid.” Science, vol. 336, no. 6077, 2012, pp. 61–64.
- Hansen, T. W., and J. B. Wagner. “Environmental TEM of Gas–Solid Reactions.” Accounts of Chemical Research, vol. 45, no. 10, 2012, pp. 1727–1735.
- Chen, Q., et al. “Liquid and Gas Environmental TEM for Materials Science.” Microscopy and Microanalysis, vol. 26, no. 2, 2020, pp. 225–239.
- Shao, S., et al. “In Situ TEM Mechanical Testing.” Progress in Materials Science, vol. 56, no. 3, 2013, pp. 382–475.
