= Helmut Ruska =

German physician and biologist

Helmut Ruska (June 7, 1908, in Heidelberg – August 30, 1973) was a German physician and biologist from Heidelberg. After earning his medical degree, he spent several years working as a physician at hospitals in Heidelberg and Berlin. During this time, he also worked closely with his brother Ernst Ruska (1906-1988) and brother-in-law Bodo von Borries (1905-56), who were both research scientists at Siemens-Reiniger-Werke. Ernst Ruska was the inventor of the electron microscope, and later winner of a Nobel Prize. From 1948 to 1951, Helmut Ruska was a professor at the University of Berlin, in 1952 he moved to the United States where he was a micromorphologist for the New York State Department of Health in Albany. He returned to Germany in 1958 as director of biophysics at the University of Düsseldorf.

Through close association with his brother, Helmut Ruska is remembered for developing the electron microscope for biological and medical applications. He was the first scientist to study "sub-microscopic" structures of parasites, bacteriophages and various viruses with an electron microscope. In the 1940s, he published numerous articles regarding his research, including Die Bedeutung der Übermikroskopie für die Virusforschung (The Significance of Electron Microscopy for Virus Research).
