= 1178 Irmela =

Stony asteroid

Discovery
- Discovered by: M. F. Wolf
- Discovery site: Heidelberg Obs.
- Discovery date: 13 March 1931

Designations
- Named after: Irmela Ruska (wife of Ernst Ruska)
- Alternative designations: 1931 EC · 1940 GC; 1962 JD · 1988 CK_{6}
- Minor planet category: main-belt · (middle)

Orbital characteristics
- Epoch 16 February 2017 (JD 2457800.5)
- Uncertainty parameter 0
- Observation arc: 85.83 yr (31,351 days)
- Aphelion: 3.1700 AU
- Perihelion: 2.1916 AU
- Semi-major axis: 2.6808 AU
- Eccentricity: 0.1825
- Orbital period (sidereal): 4.39 yr (1,603 days)
- Mean anomaly: 209.87°
- Mean motion: 0° 13^{m} 28.56^{s} / day
- Inclination: 6.9511°
- Longitude of ascending node: 170.11°
- Argument of perihelion: 357.21°

Physical characteristics
- Dimensions: 17.00±3.43 km 17.50±4.91 km 17.90±0.57 km 19.05 km (derived); 19.09±0.8 km (IRAS:15); 19.663±0.049 km 20.683±0.181 km
- Synodic rotation period: 11.989±0.001 h 19.17 h
- Geometric albedo: 0.0503±0.0031; 0.070±0.006; 0.08±0.03; 0.08±0.07; 0.0838 (derived); 0.0916±0.008 (IRAS:15); 0.105±0.007
- Spectral type: S
- Absolute magnitude (H): 11.81 · 11.87±0.35 · 11.91 · 12.14

1178 Irmela, provisional designation 1931 EC, is a stony asteroid from the middle regions of the asteroid belt, approximately 19 kilometers in diameter.

It was discovered on 13 March 1931, by German astronomer Max Wolf at Heidelberg Observatory in southwest Germany. The asteroid was named after Irmela Ruska, wife of Ernst Ruska.

== Orbit and classification ==
Irmela orbits the Sun in the central main-belt at a distance of 2.2–3.2 AU once every 4 years and 5 months (1,603 days). Its orbit has an eccentricity of 0.18 and an inclination of 7° with respect to the ecliptic. A first precovery was taken at Lowell Observatory in February 1931, extending the body's observation arc by 3 weeks prior to its official discovery observation at Heidelberg.

== Physical characteristics ==
=== Lightcurves ===
In May 1984, a first rotational lightcurve of Irmela was obtained from photometric observations by American astronomer Richard Binzel. Lightcurve analysis gave a rotation period of 19.17 hours with a brightness variation of 0.34 magnitude (U=2).

In March 2010, astronomer Robert Stephens obtained another lightcurve at the Center for Solar System Studies, that gave a divergent period of 11.989 hours with an amplitude of 0.40 magnitude (U=2).

=== Diameter and albedo ===
According to the surveys carried out by the Infrared Astronomical Satellite IRAS, the Japanese Akari satellite, and NASA's Wide-field Infrared Survey Explorer with its subsequent NEOWISE mission, Irmela measures between 17.00 and 20.683 kilometers in diameter and its surface has an albedo between 0.0503 and 0.105.

10μm radiometric data collected from Kitt Peak National Observatory in 1975, gave a diameter estimate of 19 kilometers.

The Collaborative Asteroid Lightcurve Link characterizes Irmela as a common S-type asteroid, derives an albedo of 0.0838 and calculates a diameter of 19.05 kilometers with an absolute magnitude of 11.91.

== Naming ==
This minor planet was named after Irmela Ruska, wife of the inventor of the electron microscope and 1986 Nobelist, the German physicist Ernst Ruska (1906–1988), who shared the Nobel prize with Gerd Binnig and Heinrich Rohrer. The naming was granted by Max Wolf to his colleague August Kopff, himself a prolific discoverer of minor planets. The citation was published by Paul Herget in The Names of the Minor Planets (H 109).
