= Ernst Ruska =

German physicist (1906–1988)

- Ruska in 1986
- Born: Ernst August Friedrich Ruska; 25 December 1906; Heidelberg, Grand Duchy of Baden, German Empire
- Died: 27 May 1988 (aged 81); West Berlin, Germany
- Education: Technische Universität Berlin; Technical University of Munich
- Known for: Electron Microscope
- Relatives: Helmut Ruska (brother)
- Awards: Albert Lasker Award for Basic Medical Research (1960); Paul Ehrlich and Ludwig Darmstaedter Prize (1970); Duddell Medal and Prize (1975); Robert Koch Prize (Gold, 1986); Nobel Prize in Physics (1986)
- Scientific career
- Fields: Physics
- Workplaces: Fritz Haber Institute; Technische Universität Berlin
- Doctoral advisor: Max Knoll

Notes
- Ernst Ruska constructed the first transmission electron microscope (TEM) with his mentor Max Knoll

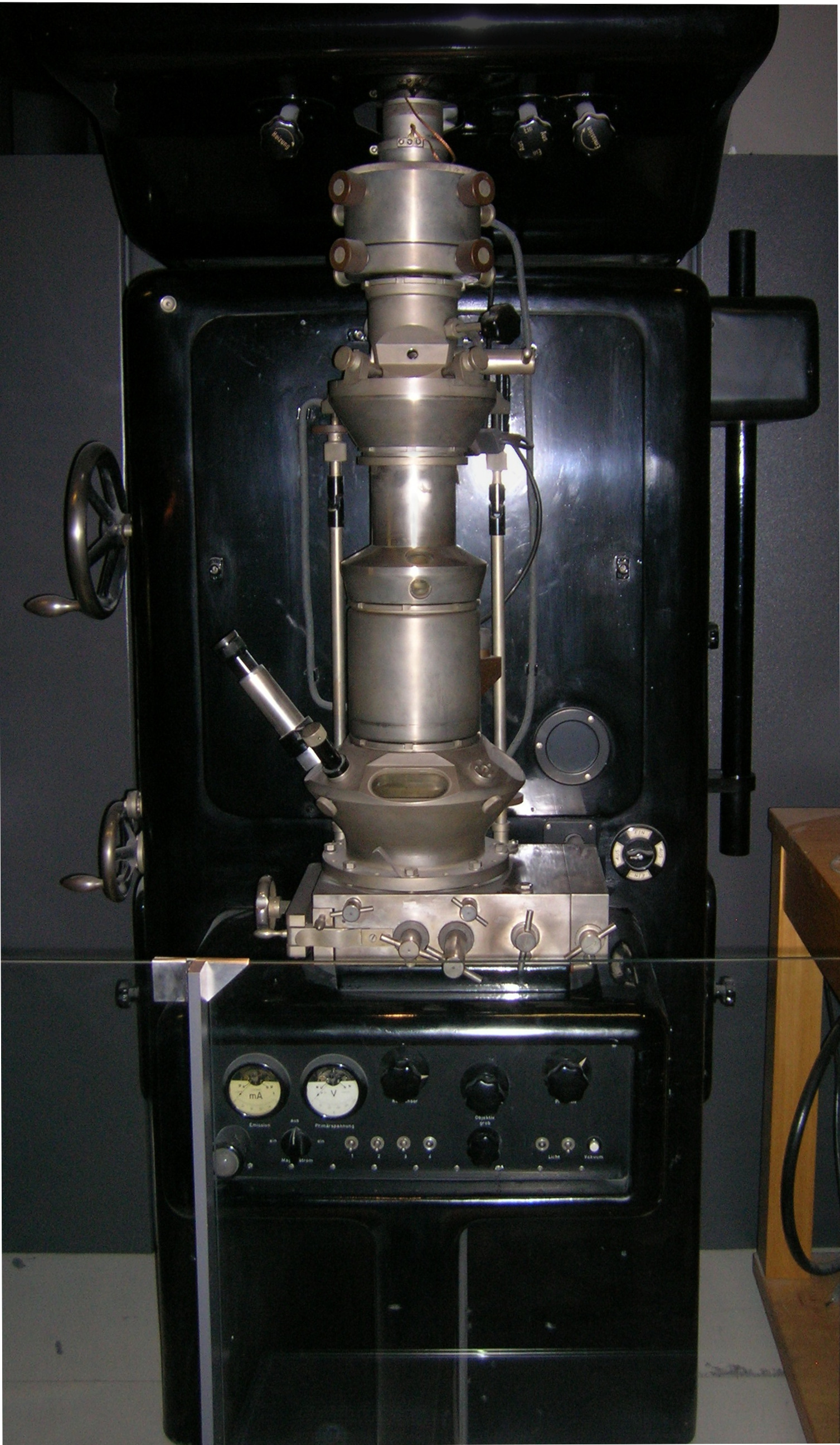
First commercial Electron microscope, constructed by Ernst Ruska in 1939

Ernst August Friedrich Ruska (German pronunciation: [ɛʁnst ˈʁʊskaː]; 25 December 1906 – 27 May 1988) was a German physicist who won the Nobel Prize in Physics in 1986 for his work in electron optics, including the design of the first electron microscope.

== Life and career ==
Ernst Ruska was born in Heidelberg, Germany. He was educated at the Technical University of Munich from 1925 to 1927 and then entered Technische Hochschule Berlin (now Technische Universität Berlin), where he posited that microscopes using electrons, with wavelengths 1000 times shorter than those of light, could provide a more detailed picture of an object than a microscope utilizing light, in which magnification is limited by the size of the wavelengths. In 1931, he demonstrated that a magnetic coil could act as an electron lens, and used several coils in a series to build the first electron microscope in 1933.

After completing his PhD in 1933, Ruska continued to work in the field of electron optics, first at Fernseh AG in Berlin-Zehlendorf, and then from 1937 at Siemens-Reiniger-Werke AG. At Siemens, he was involved in developing the first commercially produced electron microscope in 1939. As well as developing the technology of electron microscopy while at Siemens, Ruska also worked at other scientific institutions, and encouraged Siemens to set up a laboratory for visiting researchers, which was initially headed by Ruska's brother Helmut, a medical doctor who developed the use of the electron microscope for medical and biological applications.

After leaving Siemens in 1955, Ruska served as director of the Institute for Electron Microscopy of the Fritz Haber Institute until 1974. Concurrently, he served at the institute and as professor at Technische Universität Berlin from 1957 until his retirement in 1974.

In 1960 he won the Lasker Award. In 1986, he was awarded half of the Nobel Prize in Physics for his many achievements in electron optics; Gerd Binnig and Heinrich Rohrer won a quarter each for their design of the scanning tunneling microscope. He died in West Berlin in 1988.

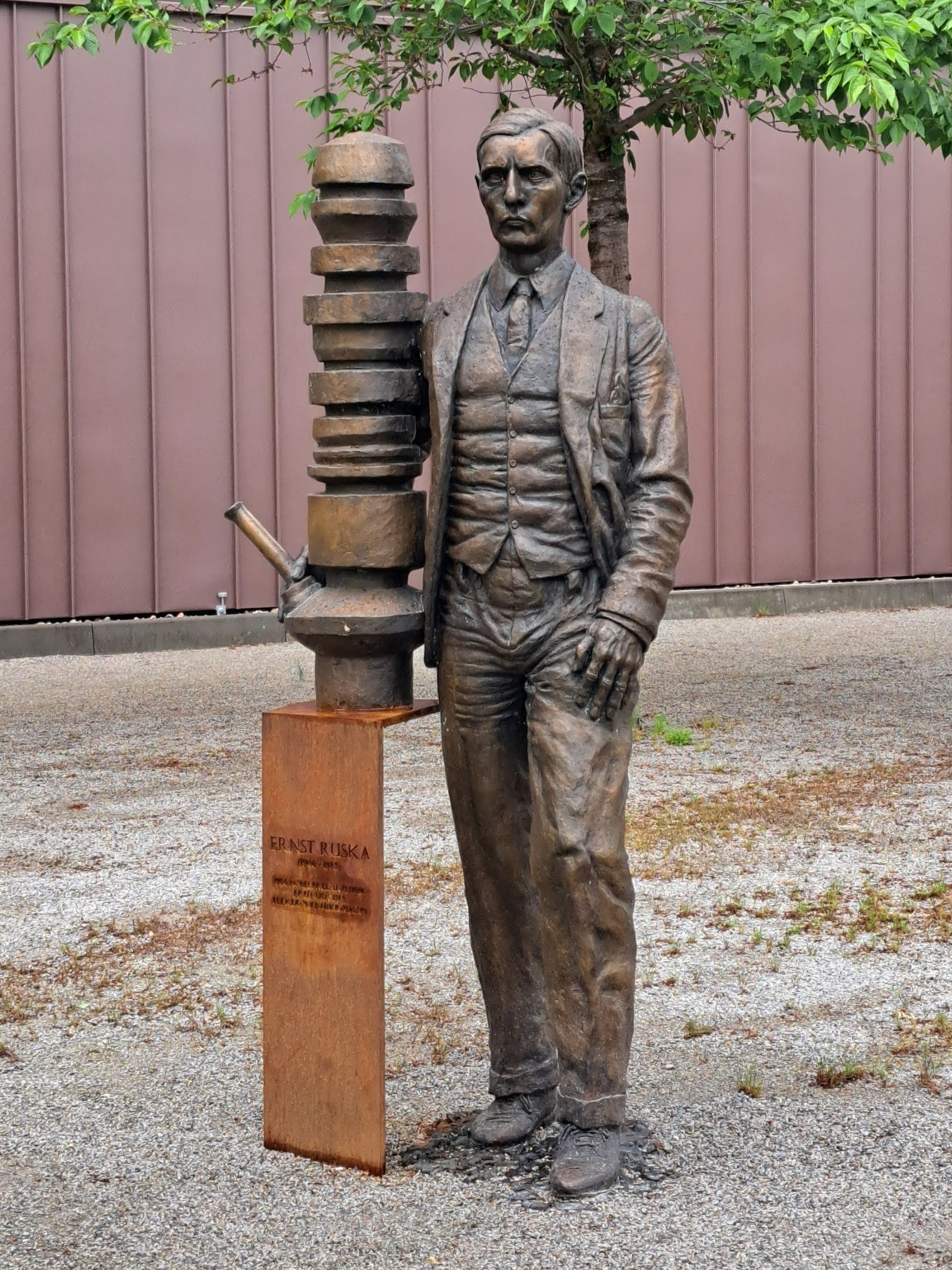
Statue in Jena, Germany

Asteroid 1178 Irmela, discovered by Max Wolf, is named after Ruska's wife Irmela, who was Wolf's niece.
