= Max Knoll =

German electrical engineer (1897–1969)

- Born: Max Knoll; 17 July 1897; Wiesbaden, Hesse, Germany
- Died: 6 November 1969 (aged 72)
- Known for: Electron Microscopy
- Scientific career
- Fields: Physics
- Workplaces: Technische Hochschule Berlin-Charlottenburg, Telefunken, Ludwig-Maximilians-Universität München, Princeton University, Technische Hochschule München

Max Knoll (17 July 1897 – 6 November 1969) was a German electrical engineer and co-inventor of the electron microscope. Knoll was born in Wiesbaden and studied at the Ludwig-Maximilians-Universität München and at the Technische Hochschule München and the Technische Hochschule Berlin-Charlottenburg, where he obtained his doctorate in the Institute for High Voltage Technology. In 1927 he became the leader of the electron research group there, where he and his co-worker, Ernst Ruska, invented the electron microscope in 1931. In April 1932, Knoll joined Telefunken in Berlin to do developmental work in the field of television design. He was also a private lecturer in Berlin.

After World War II, Knoll joined the Ludwig-Maximilians-Universität München as an extraordinary professor and director of the Institute for Electromedicine. He moved to the USA in 1948, to work at the Department of Electrical Engineering at Princeton University.

In 1956, he returned to Munich and engaged in a series of experiments at the Technische Hochschule München, involving the generation of phosphenes by electrically stimulating the brains of himself and other subjects. He retired in 1966.

== See also ==
- Scanning electron microscope
- Transmission electron microscopy
- Knoll, M.; Kugler, J. (December 1959). "Subjective Light Pattern Spectroscopy in the Encephalographic Frequency Range". Nature. 184 (4701): 1823–1824. Bibcode:1959Natur.184.1823K. doi:10.1038/1841823a0. ISSN 0028-0836. PMID 14410179.
