= Transmission Kikuchi diffraction =

Nanoscale orientation mapping method

Transmission Kikuchi diffraction setup

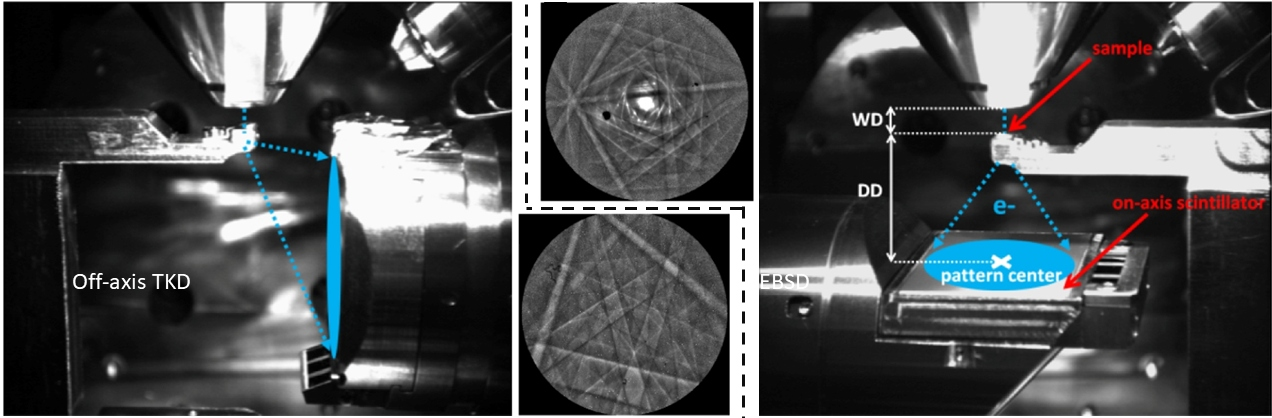
Off-axis TKD with an example EBSP. Right: On-axis TKD with an example EBSP

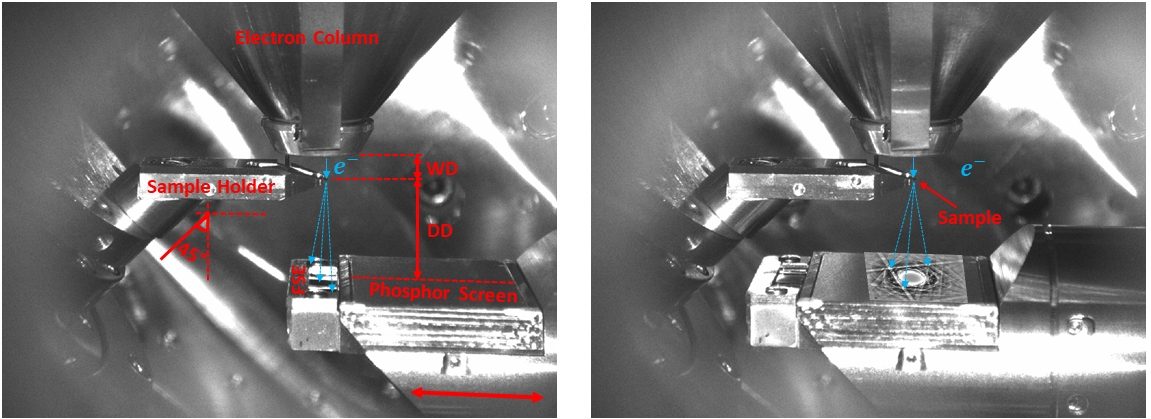
Imaging using diodes in on-axis TKD setup. Right: on-axis TKD setup

Transmission Kikuchi diffraction (TKD), also sometimes called transmission electron backscatter diffraction (t-EBSD), is a method for orientation mapping at the nanoscale. It’s used for analysing the microstructures of thin transmission electron microscopy (TEM) specimens in the scanning electron microscope (SEM). This technique has been widely utilised in the characterization of nano-crystalline materials, including oxides, superconductors, and metallic alloys.

TKD offers improved spatial resolution, enabling effective characterization of nanocrystalline materials and heavily deformed samples where high dislocation densities can prevent successful characterization using conventional Electron backscatter diffraction. Many studies have reported sub-10 nm resolution using TKD.

The main difference between diffraction spots and Kikuchi bands is that in TEM, discrete diffraction spots arise from coherent scattering of the incident beam, while the formation of Kikuchi bands is described as a two-step process consisting of incoherent scattering of the primary beam followed by coherent scattering of these forward biased electrons. TKD has also been applied to analyse fine-grained ultramylonite peridotite samples in a scanning electron microscope. The preparation of TKD samples can be done with standard methods used for transmission electron microscopy (TEM).

== Description ==
Transmission Kikuchi diffraction (TKD or t-EBSD) is an Electron backscatter diffraction (EBSD) technique that is used to analyse the crystallographic orientation and microstructure of materials at a high spatial resolution. It is a variation of convergent-beam electron diffraction, which has been introduced around the 1970s, and has since become increasingly popular in materials science research, especially for studying materials at the nanoscale.

In TKD, a thin foil sample is prepared and placed perpendicular to the electron beam of a scanning electron microscope. The electron beam is then focused on a small spot on the sample, and the crystal lattice of the sample diffracts the transmitted electrons. The diffraction pattern is then collected by a detector and analysed to determine the crystallographic orientation and microstructure of the sample.

One of the key advantages of TKD is its high spatial resolution that can reach a few nanometres. This is achieved by using a small electron beam spot size, typically less than 10 nanometres in diameter, and by collecting the transmitted electrons with a small-angle annular dark-field detector (STEM-ADF) in a scanning transmission electron microscope (STEM). Another advantage of TKD is its high sensitivity to local variations in crystallographic orientation. This is because the transmitted electrons in TKD are diffracted at very small angles, which makes the diffraction pattern highly sensitive to local variations in the crystal lattice.

TKD can also be used to study nano-sized materials, such as nanoparticles and thin films. Thin foil samples can be prepared for TKD using a Focused ion beam (FIB) or ion milling machine. However, such machines are expensive and their operation requires particular skills and training. Additionally, the diffraction patterns obtained from TKD can be more complex to interpret than those obtained from conventional EBSD techniques due to the complex geometry of the diffracted electrons.

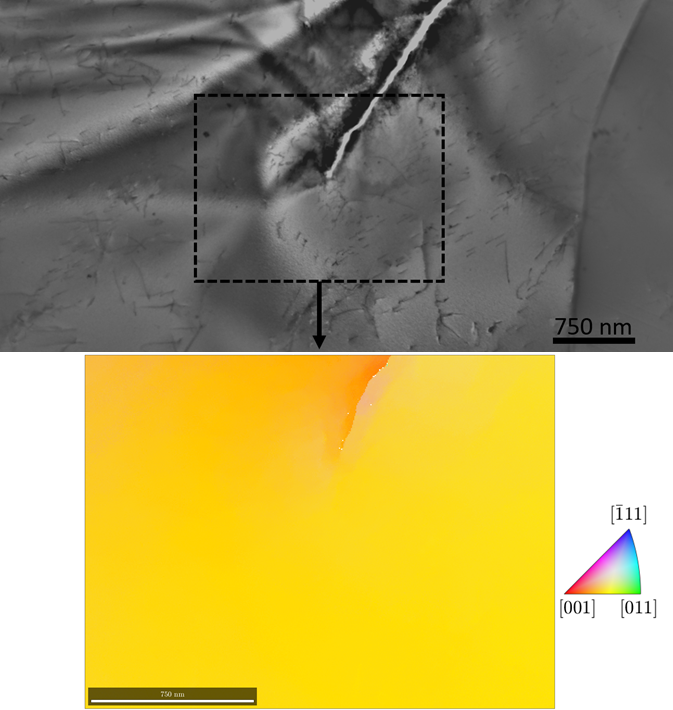
Bright field image collect using the diodes in on-axis TKD setup (up) and a TKD map collected around the crack in the ferrite phase of an age hardened duplex stainless steel collected at 30 kV. The map step size is 5 nm.

On-axis and off-axis TKD methods differ in the sample's orientation with respect to the electron beam. In on-axis TKD, the sample is oriented so that the incident electron beam is nearly perpendicular to the sample surface. This results in a diffraction pattern that is nearly centred around the transmitted beam direction. On-axis TKD is typically used for analysing samples with low lattice strain and high crystallographic symmetry, such as single crystals or large grains.

In off-axis TKD, the sample is tilted with respect to the incident electron beam, typically at an angle of several degrees. This results in a diffraction pattern that is shifted away from the transmitted beam direction. Off-axis TKD is typically used for analysing samples with high lattice strain and/or low crystallographic symmetry, such as nano-crystalline materials or materials with defects. Off-axis TKD is often preferred for materials science research because it provides more information about the crystallographic orientation and microstructure of the sample, especially in samples with a high density of defects or a high degree of lattice strain. However, on-axis TKD can still be useful for studying samples with high crystallographic symmetry or for verifying the crystallographic orientation of a sample before performing off-axis TKD. The on-axis technique can speed up acquisition by more than 20 times, and a low scattering angle setup also gives rise to higher quality patterns.

EBSD resolution is influenced by multiple factors including the beam size, electron accelerating voltage, the material's atomic mass and the specimen's thickness. Out of these variables, sample thickness has the greatest effect on the pattern quality and resolution of the image. An increase in the sample thickness broadens the beam, thus reducing the lateral spatial resolution.
