= Precession electron diffraction =

Averaging technique for electron diffraction

Geometry of electron beam in precession electron diffraction. Original diffraction patterns collected by C.S. Own at Northwestern University

Precession electron diffraction (PED) is a specialized method to collect electron diffraction patterns in a transmission electron microscope (TEM). By rotating (precessing) a tilted incident electron beam around the central axis of the microscope, a PED pattern is formed by integration over a collection of diffraction conditions. This produces a quasi-kinematical diffraction pattern that is more suitable as input into direct methods algorithms to determine the crystal structure of the sample.

== Overview ==
=== Geometry ===
Precession electron diffraction is accomplished utilizing the standard instrument configuration of a modern TEM. The animation illustrates the geometry used to generate a PED pattern. Specifically, the beam tilt coils located pre-specimen are used to tilt the electron beam off of the optic axis so it is incident with the specimen at an angle, φ. The image shift coils post-specimen are then used to tilt the diffracted beams back in a complementary manner such that the direct beam falls in the center of the diffraction pattern. Finally, the beam is precessed around the optic axis while the diffraction pattern is collected over multiple revolutions.

The result of this process is a diffraction pattern that consists of a summation or integration over the patterns generated during precession. While the geometry of this pattern matches the pattern associated with a normally incident beam, the intensities of the various reflections approximate those of the kinematical pattern much more closely. At any moment in time during precession, the diffraction pattern consists of a Laue circle with a radius equal to the precession angle, φ. These snapshots contain far fewer strongly excited reflections than a normal zone axis pattern and extend farther into reciprocal space. Thus, the composite pattern will display far less dynamical character, and will be well suited for use as input into direct methods calculations.

=== Advantages ===
PED possesses many advantageous attributes that make it well suited to investigating crystal structures via direct methods approaches:

1. Quasi-kinematical diffraction patterns: While the underlying physics of the electron diffraction is still dynamical in nature, the conditions used to collect PED patterns minimize many of these effects. The scan/de-scan procedure reduces ion channeling because the pattern is generated off of the zone axis. Integration via precession of the beam minimizes the effect of non-systematic inelastic scattering, such as Kikuchi lines. Few reflections are strongly excited at any moment during precession, and those that are excited are generally much closer to a two-beam condition (dynamically coupled only to the forward-scattered beam). Furthermore, for large precession angles, the radius of the excited Laue circle becomes quite large. These contributions combine such that the overall integrated diffraction pattern resembles the kinematical pattern much more closely than a single zone axis pattern.
2. Broader range of measured reflections: The Laue circle (see Ewald sphere) that is excited at any given moment during precession extends farther into reciprocal space. After integration over multiple precessions, many more reflections in the zeroeth order Laue zone (ZOLZ) are present, and as stated previously, their relative intensities are much more kinematical. This provides considerably more information to input into direct methods calculations, improving the accuracy of phase determination algorithms. Similarly, more higher order Laue zone (HOLZ) reflections are present in the pattern, which can provide more complete information about the three-dimensional nature of reciprocal space, even in a single two-dimensional PED pattern.
3. Practical robustness: PED is less sensitive to small experimental variations than other electron diffraction techniques. Since the measurement is an average over many incident beam directions, the pattern is less sensitive to slight misorientation of the zone axis from the optic axis of the microscope, and resulting PED patterns will generally still display the zone axis symmetry. The patterns obtained are also less sensitive to the thickness of the sample, a parameter with strong influence in standard electron diffraction patterns.
4. Very small probe size: Because x-rays interact so weakly with matter, there is a minimum size limit of approximately 5 μm for single crystals that can be examined via x-ray diffraction methods. In contrast, electrons can be used to probe much smaller nano-crystals in a TEM. In PED, the probe size is limited by the lens aberrations and sample thickness. With a typical value for spherical aberration, the minimum probe size is usually around 50 nm. However, with Cs corrected microscopes, the probe can be made much smaller.

=== Practical considerations ===
Precession electron diffraction is typically conducted using accelerating voltages between 100-400 kV. Patterns can be formed under parallel or convergent beam conditions. Most modern TEMs can achieve a tilt angle, φ, ranging from 0-3°. Precession frequencies can be varied from Hz to kHz, but in standard cases 60 Hz has been used. In choosing a precession rate, it is important to ensure that many revolutions of the beam occur over the relevant exposure time used to record the diffraction pattern. This ensures adequate averaging over the excitation error of each reflection. Beam sensitive samples may dictate shorter exposure times and thus, motivate the use of higher precession frequencies.

One of the most significant parameters affecting the diffraction pattern obtained is the precession angle, φ. In general, larger precession angles result in more kinematical diffraction patterns, but both the capabilities of the beam tilt coils in the microscope and the requirements on the probe size limit how large this angle can become in practice. Because PED takes the beam off of the optic axis by design, it accentuates the effect of the spherical aberrations within the probe forming lens. For a given spherical aberration, C_{s}, the probe diameter, d, varies with convergence angle, α, and precession angle, φ, as

$d \propto 4 C_s \phi^2 \alpha$

Thus, if the specimen of interest is quite small, the maximum precession angle will be restrained. This is most significant for conditions of convergent beam illumination. 50 nm is a general lower limit on probe size for standard TEMs operating at high precession angles (>30 mrad), but can be surpassed in C_{s} corrected instruments. In principle the minimum precessed probe can reach approximately the full-width-half-max (FWHM) of the converged un-precessed probe in any instrument, however in practice the effective precessed probe is typically ~10-50x larger due to uncontrolled aberrations present at high angles of tilt. For example, a 2 nm precessed probe with >40 mrad precession angle was demonstrated in an aberration-corrected Nion UltraSTEM with native sub-Å probe (aberrations corrected to ~35 mrad half-angle).

If the precession angle is made too large, further complications due to the overlap of the ZOLZ and HOLZ reflections in the projected pattern can occur. This complicates the indexing of the diffraction pattern and can corrupt the measured intensities of reflections near the overlap region, thereby reducing the effectiveness of the collected pattern for direct methods calculations.

=== Theoretical considerations ===
For an introduction to the theory of electron diffraction, see part 2 of Williams and Carter's Transmission Electron Microscopy text

While it is clear that precession reduces many of the dynamical diffraction effects that plague other forms of electron diffraction, the resulting patterns cannot be considered purely kinematical in general. There are models that attempt to introduce corrections to convert measured PED patterns into true kinematical patterns that can be used for more accurate direct methods calculations, with varying degrees of success. Here, the most basic corrections are discussed. In purely kinematical diffraction, the intensities of various $\mathbf{g}$ reflections, $I_\mathbf{g}^{kinematical}$, are related to the square of the amplitude of the structure factor, $F_\mathbf{g}$ by the equation:

$$\begin{align}
I_\mathbf{g}^{kinematical}=|F_\mathbf{g} |^2
\end{align}$$

This relationship is generally far from accurate for experimental dynamical electron diffraction and when many reflections have a large excitation error. First, a Lorentz correction analogous to that used in x-ray diffraction can be applied to account for the fact that reflections are infrequently exactly at the Bragg condition over the course of a PED measurement. This geometrical correction factor can be shown to assume the approximate form:

$I_\mathbf{g}^{kinematical} \propto I_\mathbf{g}^{experimental} \cdot g\sqrt{1-\frac{g}{2R_o}}$

where g is the reciprocal space magnitude of the reflection in question and R_{o} is the radius of the Laue circle, usually taken to be equal to φ. While this correction accounts for the integration over the excitation error, it takes no account for the dynamical effects that are ever-present in electron diffraction. This has been accounted for using a two-beam correction following the form of the Blackman correction originally developed for powder x-ray diffraction. Combining this with the aforementioned Lorentz correction yields:

$I_\mathbf{g}^{kinematical} \propto I_\mathbf{g}^{experimental} \cdot g\sqrt{1-\frac{g}{2R_o}} \cdot \int\limits_0^{A_\mathbf{g}}J_0(2x)\, dx$

where $A_\mathbf{g} = \frac{2 \pi t F_\mathbf{g}}{k}$, $t$ is the sample thickness, and $k$ is the wave-vector of the electron beam. $J_0$ is the Bessel function of zeroeth order.

This form seeks to correct for both geometric and dynamical effects, but is still only an approximation that often fails to significantly improve the kinematic quality of the diffraction pattern (sometimes even worsening it). More complete and accurate treatments of these theoretical correction factors have been shown to adjust measured intensities into better agreement with kinematical patterns. For details, see Chapter 4 of reference.

Only by considering the full dynamical model through multislice calculations can the diffraction patterns generated by PED be simulated. However, this requires the crystal potential to be known, and thus is most valuable in refining the crystal potentials suggested through direct methods approaches. The theory of precession electron diffraction is still an active area of research, and efforts to improve on the ability to correct measured intensities without a priori knowledge are ongoing.

== Historical development ==
The first precession electron diffraction system was developed by Vincent and Midgley in Bristol, UK and published in 1994. Preliminary investigation into the Er_{2}Ge_{2}O_{7} crystal structure demonstrated the feasibility of the technique at reducing dynamical effects and providing quasi-kinematical patterns that could be solved through direct methods to determine crystal structure. Over the next ten years, a number of university groups developed their own precession systems and verified the technique by solving complex crystal structures, including the groups of J. Gjønnes (Oslo), Migliori (Bologna), and L. Marks (Northwestern).

In 2004, NanoMEGAS developed the first commercial precession system capable of being retrofit to any modern TEM. This hardware solution enabled more widespread implementation of the technique and spurred its more mainstream adoption into the crystallography community. Software methods have also been developed to achieve the necessary scanning and descanning using the built-in electronics of the TEM. HREM Research Inc has developed the QED plug-in for the DigitalMicrograph software. This plug-in enables the widely used software package to collect precession electron diffraction patterns without additional modifications to the microscope.

According to NanoMEGAS, as of June, 2015, more than 200 publications have relied on the technique to solve or corroborate crystal structures; many on materials that could not be solved by other conventional crystallography techniques like x-ray diffraction. Their retrofit hardware system is used in more than 75 laboratories across the world.

== Applications ==
=== Crystallography ===
The primary goal of crystallography is to determine the three dimensional arrangement of atoms in a crystalline material. While historically, x-ray crystallography has been the predominant experimental method used to solve crystal structures ab initio, the advantages of precession electron diffraction make it one of the preferred methods of electron crystallography.

==== Symmetry determination ====
The symmetry of a crystalline material has profound impacts on its emergent properties, including electronic band structure, electromagnetic behavior, and mechanical properties . Crystal symmetry is described and categorized by the crystal system, lattice, and space group of the material. Determination of these attributes is an important aspect of crystallography.

Precession electron diffraction enables much more direct determination of space group symmetries over other forms of electron diffraction. Because of the increased number of reflections in both the zero order Laue zone and higher order Laue zones, the geometric relationship between Laue zones is more readily determined. This provides three-dimensional information about the crystal structure that can be used to determine its space group. Furthermore, because the PED technique is insensitive to slight misorientation from the zone axis, it provides the practical benefit of more robust data collection.

==== Direct methods ====
Direct methods in crystallography are a collection of mathematical techniques that seek to determine crystal structure based on measurements of diffraction patterns and potentially other a priori knowledge (constraints). The central challenge of inverting measured diffraction intensities (i.e. applying an inverse Fourier Transform) to determine the original crystal potential is that phase information is lost in general since intensity is a measurement of the square of the modulus of the amplitude of any given diffracted beam. This is known as the phase problem of crystallography.

If the diffraction can be considered kinematical, constraints may be used to probabilistically relate the phases of the reflections to their amplitudes, and the original structure can be solved via direct methods (see Sayre equation as an example). Kinematical diffraction is often the case in x-ray diffraction, and is one of the primary reasons that technique has been so successful at solving crystal structures. However, in electron diffraction, the probing wave interacts much more strongly with the electrostatic crystal potential, and complex dynamical diffraction effects can dominate the measured diffraction patterns. This makes application of direct methods much more challenging without a priori knowledge of the structure in question.

==== Ab Initio structure determination ====
Diffraction patterns collected through PED often agree well-enough with the kinematical pattern to serve as input data for direct methods calculations. A three-dimensional set of intensities mapped over the reciprocal lattice can be generated by collecting diffraction patterns over multiple zone axes. Applying direct methods to this data set will then yield probable crystal structures. Coupling direct methods results with simulations (e.g. multislice) and iteratively refining the solution can lead to the ab initio determination of the crystal structure.

The PED technique has been used to determine the crystal structure of many classes of materials. Initial investigations during the emergence of the technique focused on complex oxides and nano-precipitates in Aluminum alloys that could not be resolved using x-ray diffraction. Since becoming a more widespread crystallographic technique, many more complex metal oxide structures have been solved.

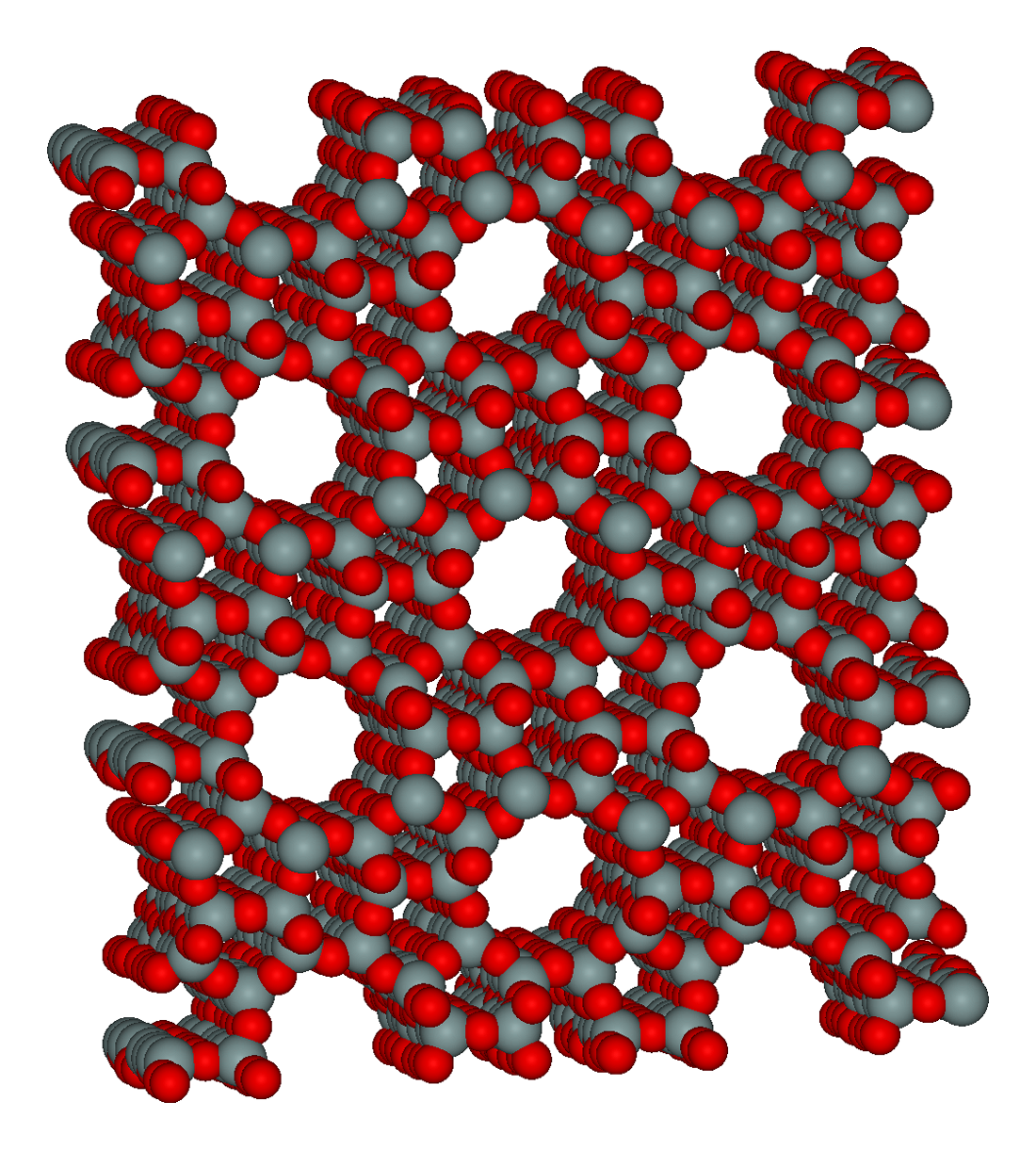
Example of a zeolite structure

Zeolites are a technologically valuable class of materials that have historically been difficult to solve using x-ray diffraction due to the large unit cells that typically occur. PED has been demonstrated to be a viable alternative to solving many of these structures, including the ZSM-10, MCM-68, and many of the ITQ-n class of zeolite structures.

PED also enables the use of electron diffraction to investigate beam-sensitive organic materials. Because PED can reproduce symmetric zone axis diffraction patterns even when the zone axis is not perfectly aligned, it enables information to be extracted from sensitive samples without risking overexposure during a time-intensive orientation of the sample.

==== Automated diffraction tomography ====
Automated diffraction tomography (ADT) uses software to collect diffraction patterns over a series of slight tilt increments. In this way, a three-dimensional (tomographic) data set of reciprocal lattice intensities can be generated and used for structure determination. By coupling this technique with PED, the range and quality of the data set can be improved. The combination of ADT-PED has been employed effectively to investigate complex framework structures and beam-sensitive organic crystals

=== Orientation mapping ===
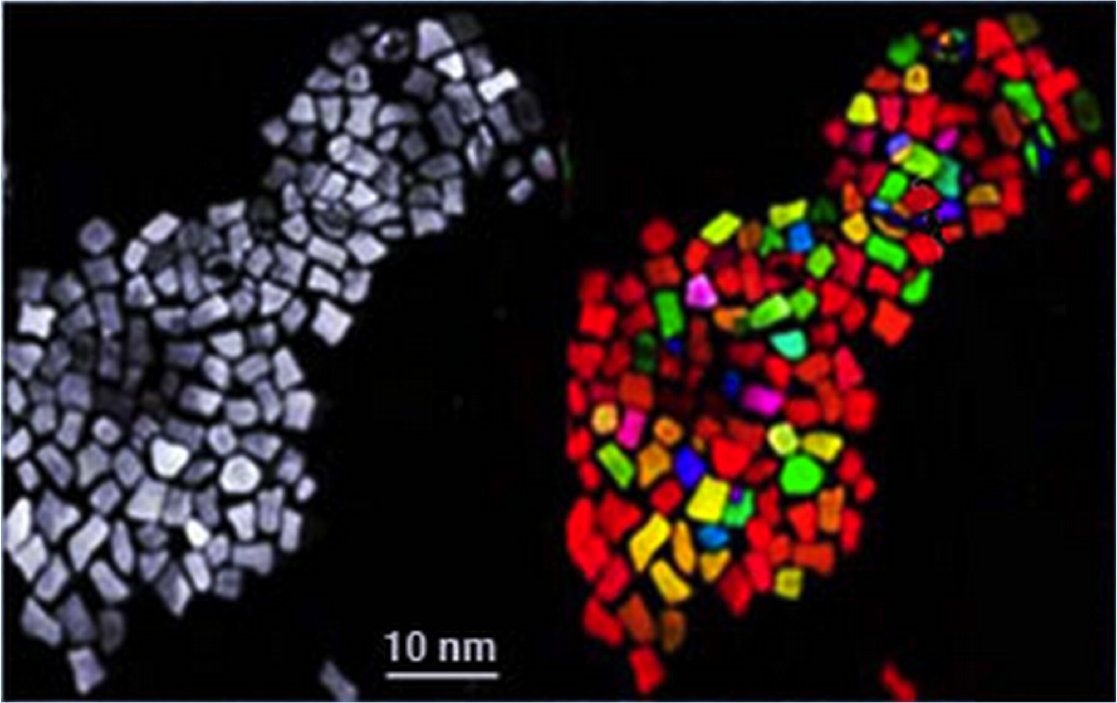
ASTAR TEM Orientation imaging of gold particles, courtesy of Dr. Mauro Gemmi, IIT Pisa Italia

Mapping the relative orientation of crystalline grains and/or phases helps understand material texture at the micro and nano scales. In a transmission electron microscope, this is accomplished by recording a diffraction pattern at a large number of points (pixels) over a region of the crystalline specimen. By comparing the recorded patterns to a database of known patterns (either previously indexed experimental patterns or simulated patterns), the relative orientation of grains in the field of view can be determined.

Because this process is highly automated, the quality of the recorded diffraction patterns is crucial to the software's ability to accurately compare and assign orientations to each pixel. Thus, the advantages of PED are well-suited for use with this scanning technique. By instead recording a PED pattern at each pixel, dynamical effects are reduced, and the patterns are more easily compared to simulated data, improving the accuracy of the automated phase/orientation assignment.

== Beyond diffraction ==
Although the PED technique was initially developed for its improved diffraction applications, the advantageous properties of the technique have been found to enhance many other investigative techniques in the TEM. These include bright field and dark field imaging, electron tomography, and composition-probing techniques like energy-dispersive x-ray spectroscopy (EDS) and electron energy loss spectroscopy (EELS).

=== Imaging ===
Though many people conceptualize images and diffraction patterns separately, they contain principally the same information. In the simplest approximation, the two are simply Fourier transforms of one another. Thus, the effects of beam precession on diffraction patterns also have significant effects on the corresponding images in the TEM. Specifically, the reduced dynamical intensity transfer between beams that is associated with PED results in reduced dynamical contrast in images collected during precession of the beam. This includes a reduction in thickness fringes, bend contours, and strain fields. While these features can often provide useful information, their suppression enables a more straightforward interpretation of diffraction contrast and mass contrast in images.

=== Tomography ===
In an extension of the application of PED to imaging, electron tomography can benefit from the reduction of dynamic contrast effects. Tomography entails collecting a series of images (2-D projections) at various tilt angles and combining them to reconstruct the three dimensional structure of the specimen. Because many dynamical contrast effects are highly sensitive to the orientation of the crystalline sample with respect to the incident beam, these effects can convolute the reconstruction process in tomography. Similarly to single imaging applications, by reducing dynamical contrast, interpretation of the 2-D projections and thus the 3-D reconstruction are more straightforward.

=== Investigating composition ===
Energy-dispersive x-ray spectroscopy (EDS) and electron energy loss spectroscopy (EELS) are commonly used techniques to both qualitatively and quantitatively probe the composition of samples in the TEM. A primary challenge in the quantitative accuracy of both techniques is the phenomenon of channelling. Put simply, in a crystalline solid, the probability of interaction between an electron and ion in the lattice depends strongly on the momentum (direction and velocity) of the electron. When probing a sample under diffraction conditions near a zone axis, as is often the case in EDS and EELS applications, channelling can have a large impact on the effective interaction of the incident electrons with specific ions in the crystal structure. In practice, this can lead to erroneous measurements of composition that depend strongly on the orientation and thickness of the sample and the accelerating voltage. Since PED entails an integration over incident directions of the electron probe, and generally does not include beams parallel to the zone axis, the detrimental channeling effects outlined above can be minimized, yielding far more accurate composition measurements in both techniques.
