= Jon Gjønnes =

Norwegian physicist (1931–2021)

- Born: 26 January 1931; Brevik, Norway
- Died: 6 April 2021 (aged 90); Oslo, Norway
- Education: University of Oslo
- Occupation: Physicist

Jon Kjell Gjønnes (26 January 1931 – 6 April 2021) was a Norwegian physicist.

== Career ==
Born in Brevik, Gjønnes graduated as cand. real. from the University of Oslo in 1957, and as dr.philos. in 1967. He was appointed professor at the University of Oslo in 1982. His research contributions were mainly in the fields of x-ray diffraction, electron diffraction and electron microscopy.

In 2008 he was the inaugural recipient of a medal for outstanding contribution to the Field of Electron crystallography, from the International Union of Crystallography; the medal was named the Gjønnes Medal in his honour. He was a fellow of the Norwegian Academy of Science and Letters from 1987.

Gjønnes was also an elected member of Bærum municipal council and from 1979 to 1981 a political adviser in Nordli's Cabinet.
