= Quekett =

Quekett is a surname. It may refer to:

- Edwin John Quekett (1808–1847), English botanist, histologist, and microscopist, brother of John Thomas and William Quekett
- John Frederick Whitlie Quekett (1849–1913), English born South African conchologist and museum curator, son of John Thomas Quekett
- John Thomas Quekett (1815–1861), English microscopist and histologist, brother of Edwin John and William Quekett
- William Quekett (1802–1888), English rector of Warrington, Lancashire, brother of Edwin John and John Thomas Quekett

== See also ==
- Quekett Microscopical Club, named for John Thomas Quekett
- Quekettia, plant genus and animal genus
