= Maddy Parsons =

British biologist and academic

Madeline Parsons
- Education: University of Bath; University College London
- Scientific career
- Workplaces: King's College London
- Thesis: The effect of mechanical load on dermal fibroblast collagen deposition and organisation

Maddy Parsons is a British cell biologist who is a professor and Associate Dean for Impact & Innovation at King's College London. She is the Director of the Nikon Imaging Centre. Her research looks to understand the fundamental mechanisms that underpin cell adhesion and migration. She is Chair of the Medical Research Council Molecular & Cellular Medicine Board.

== Early life and education ==
Parsons completed her undergraduate training in biology at the University of Bath. She moved to University College London for her doctoral research, where she studied the impact of mechanical load on the deposition and organisation of dermal fibroblast.

== Research and career ==
Parsons joined King's College London as a Royal Society University Research Fellow in 2005. She was promoted to Reader in 2013, and Professor in 2015. Parsons investigates the fundamental mechanisms that drive cell adhesion and migration using microscopy, molecular biology and three-dimensional simulations. She uses a confocal super-resolution microscope and Total internal reflection fluorescence microscope to image dynamic events over long periods. Whilst adhesion is critical to normal cellular function (e.g. development and homeostasis), it also drives cancer and fibrosis. In particular, Parsons focuses on integrins, and their behaviour in the extracellular matrix. By comparing "normal" cells with cancer cells, Parsons identified that the likelihood of cell invasion depended on the duration and chemistry of their adhesion with the matrix. Beyond fundamental cellular processes, Parsons has studied wound healing and inflammation using skin and lung epithelial cells.

Parsons founded UKRI Technology Touching Life Integrated Biological Imaging Network, a multi-university, multidisciplinary research effort focussed on the development of strategies to understand and combat human disease. The network looks to understand the signalling hierarchy of cell adhesion, the molecular cues that regulate cell behaviour and the tissue mechanics that control cell growth.

In 2017, Parsons was appointed to the executive committee of the Royal Microscopical Society. She is Editor in Chief of The International Journal of Biochemistry & Cell Biology.

In 2021, Parsons was appointed Chair of the Medical Research Council Molecular & Cellular Medicine Board.

== Awards and honours ==
- 2014 Royal Microscopical Society Life Sciences Medal
- 2014 Fellow of Royal Society of Biology
- 2018 Fellow of Royal Microscopical Society
- 2019 Biochemical Society Industry and Collaboration Award
- 2024 Fellow of the Academy of Medical Sciences

== Selected publications ==
- Carsten Grashoff; Brenton D Hoffman; Michael D Brenner; et al. (1 July 2010). "Measuring mechanical tension across vinculin reveals regulation of focal adhesion dynamics". Nature. 466 (7303): 263–266. Bibcode:2010Natur.466..263G. doi:10.1038/nature09198. ISSN 1476-4687. PMC 2901888. PMID 20613844. Wikidata Q29615714.
- Patrick T Caswell; Heather J Spence; Maddy Parsons; et al. (1 October 2007). "Rab25 associates with alpha5beta1 integrin to promote invasive migration in 3D microenvironments". Developmental Cell. 13 (4): 496–510. doi:10.1016/j.devcel.2007.08.012. ISSN 1534-5807. PMID 17925226. Wikidata Q24296948.
- I A Akers; M Parsons; M R Hill; M D Hollenberg; S Sanjar; G J Laurent; Robin J McAnulty (1 January 2000). "Mast cell tryptase stimulates human lung fibroblast proliferation via protease-activated receptor-2". American Journal of Physiology - Lung Cellular and Molecular Physiology. 278 (1): L193-201. doi:10.1152/ajplung.2000.278.1.l193. ISSN 1040-0605. PMID 10645907. Wikidata Q73382005.
