= Edwin John Quekett =

British botanist (1808–1847)

Edwin John Quekett FRMS (1808–1847) was an early worker in botany and histology, and a microscopist.

== Biography ==
E.J. Quekett, born at Langport in 1808, was the son of William Quekett and Mary, daughter of John Bartlett. His younger brother was John Thomas Quekett, whose contributions to the same fields of research have a greater renown. Their eldest brother, William Quekett, was a rector and author.

He received his medical training at University College Hospital, and practised as a surgeon in Wellclose Square, Whitechapel. In 1835 he became lecturer on botany at the London Hospital; he was elected a fellow of the Linnean Society in 1836. It was at his house in 1839 that the meetings were held in which the Royal Microscopical Society originated. He died on 28 June 1847 of diphtheria, and was buried at Sea Salter, Kent, near the grave of Elizabeth Hyder, to whom he had been engaged, but who had died of consumption on the day arranged for their marriage in September 1841. His name was commemorated by John Lindley in the Brazilian genus of orchids, Quekettia, which contains numerous microscopic crystals. Fifteen papers stand to Edwin Quekett's name in the Royal Society's Catalogue of Scientific Papers (v. 53), mostly dealing with vegetable histology, and contributed to the Transactions of the Linnean and Microscopical Societies, The Phytologist, the Annals and Magazine of Natural History and the London Physiological Journal between 1838 and the date of his death. In 1843–4 he was one of the editors of the last-named journal.
