= W. Lens Aldous =

British illustrator

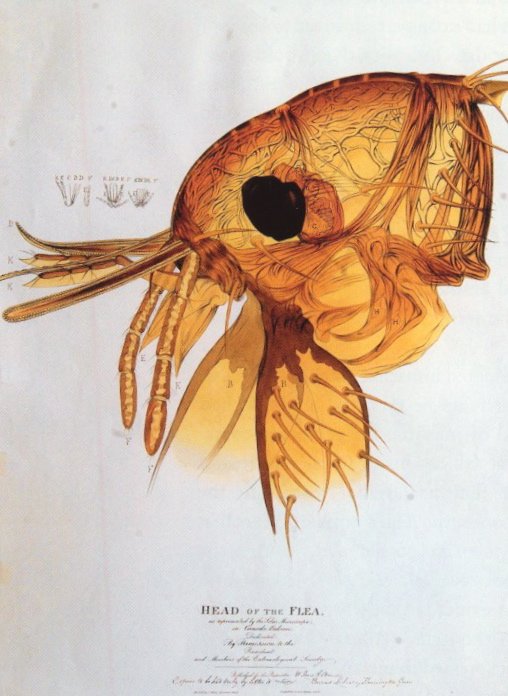
"Head of the Flea"

William Lens Aldous (baptized 29 September 1792 – 19 November 1878) was a British illustrator who reproduced findings of the early workers in microscopy, and an early member of the Royal Microscopical Society.

Aldous was the son of Jonathan and Mary Aldous and was baptized at St. Leonard's, Shoreditch. He lived in the south of London. He worked with J. B. Reade, a pioneer of experimental photography.

His coloured lithograph, 'Head of a Flea', was presented to the Entomological Society of London on 7 May 1838, who adopted it for a poster. Reade's letters to his contemporaries describe how Aldous began his illustrations of microscopy with this illustration, after a drawing, “highly magnified figure of the head of a flea” (1837), derived from his experiments in microscopic photography. Other works included a portrait of the microscopist and histologist John Thomas Quekett.

Aldous died in St Leonards-on-Sea and was buried in Hastings Cemetery.
