= Langport Town Hall =

Municipal building in Langport, Somerset, England

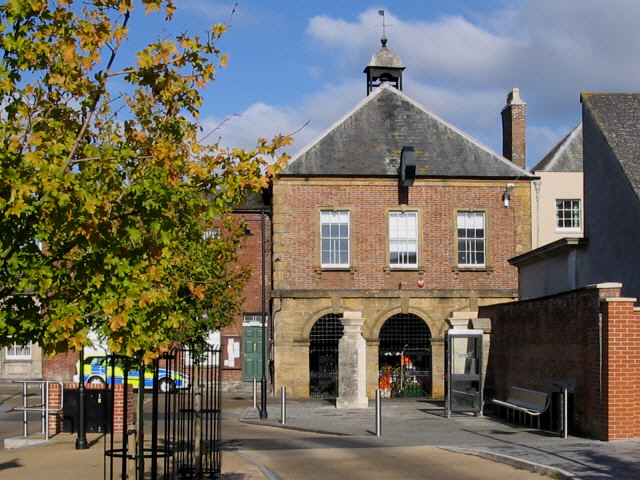
- Langport Town Hall

- Shown in Somerset
- 51.0375°N 2.8295°W
- Location: Bow Street, Langport

History
- Built: 1732

Site notes
- Architectural style: Neoclassical style

Listed Building – Grade II
- Official name: The Town Hall
- Designated: 17 April 1959
- Reference no.: 1056610

Langport Town Hall is a municipal building in Bow Street in Langport, Somerset, England. The building is managed by Landmark Langport. It is a Grade II listed building.

== History ==
The first municipal building in Langport was a market hall at the junction between Bow Street and Cheapside which was erected in around 1563. The borough council briefly moved to former Chantry Chapel of the Blessed Virgin Mary ("the Hanging Chapel") in the late 16th century only to move back again a few years later. By the mid-17th century the Bow Street building accommodated a jury chamber.

In the early 1730s, the then-portreeve offered the borough council a loan with which to re-build the building on the same site. The new structure was designed in the neoclassical style, built in red brick and ashlar stone and was completed in 1732. The design involved a symmetrical main frontage with three bays facing onto Bow Street; the ground floor, which was faced in ashlar stone featured three round headed openings with keystones. The first floor was fenestrated with sash windows with architraves and keystones and, at roof level, there was a wooden bell turret with a finial and a weather vane. Internally, the principal rooms were the undercroft at the front of the building on the ground floor and the council chamber, which was also used as a courtroom, on the first floor.

An octagonal projecting clock was installed on the front of the building in 1802 and a strong-room was added and the kitchen was improved in 1836. Wrought iron gates were fitted to the openings on the ground floor in 1840 and the projecting clock was replaced by a London-based clock-making business, J. W. Benson Limited, in 1883.

Following the implementation of the Municipal Corporations Act 1883, which abolished the borough council, the council chamber became the meeting place of Langport Parish Council and also started operating as a community events venue. In 1888, the building was transferred to the ownership a new entity, the Langport Town Trust, the trustees of which undertook to maintain both the town hall and the Hanging Chapel into the future. The fire engine was moved to the town hall in 1925 and remained there until local fire services began to be provided from Somerton in 1939. A significant legacy from a former clerk to the parish council, William John Carne-Hill, was applied for the upkeep of the town hall from 1970 and, following local government re-organisation, the parish council was renamed Langport Town Council in 1974.

The garden behind the town hall, also managed by Landmark Langport, was landscaped with funding from Tesco, in accordance with the conditions of the planning consent for a new retail store in the area, in 2002. It was renamed the Walter Bagehot Town Garden in 2012 to commemorate the life of the locally-born political journalist and constitutional historian, Walter Bagehot.
