= Charles Thomas Hudson =

English naturalist

Charles Thomas Hudson (11 March 1828 – 23 October 1903) was an English naturalist, particularly interested in microscopical research, and in the microscopic animal rotifer.

== Early life and teaching career ==
Hudson was born in 1828 in Brompton, London, third of five sons of John Corrie Hudson, chief clerk of the Legacy Duty Office, and wife Emily. His father in youth was an advanced radical and friend of William Godwin, of the Shelleys, Charles Lamb and William Hazlitt.

He was educated at Kensington Grammar School and The Grange, Sunderland. He was musical, and as a young man wrote and composed songs. Family circumstances compelled him to earn his living by teaching at an early age, in Glasgow and later at the Liverpool Royal Institution. In 1848 he went to St John's College, Cambridge, where he graduated in 1852, proceeding M.A. in 1855 and LL.D. in 1866. After leaving Cambridge he became on 25 July 1852 second master of Bristol Grammar School, and on 30 March 1855 he was appointed headmaster.

He resigned this post at midsummer 1860, after which John Caldicott took his position. A year later, Hudson opened a private school at Manilla Hall, Clifton, Bristol, formerly the residence of Sir William Draper, which he conducted until 1881. Hudson's varied interests and sympathies made the school successful. Afterwards he lived at 6 Royal York Crescent, Clifton; in 1891 he moved to Dawlish, Devon, and in 1899 to Shanklin, Isle of Wight. During his later years he often gave lectures, chiefly at public schools, on natural history, which he illustrated with coloured transparencies of his own construction.

== Microscopical research ==
Hudson devoted his leisure to microscopical research, and in particular to the study of the Rotifera. His earliest investigations on the microscopic animals dated to around 1854. His first printed paper was on Rhinops Vitrea in the Annals and Magazine of Natural History for 1869. Afterwards he published numerous papers in the Microscopical Journal and the Quarterly Journal of Microscopical Science, describing new genera and species of Rotifera, of which Pedalion mirum was a notable discovery. A list of these papers is given in the Journal of the Royal Microscopical Society for 1904, page 49.

He was elected fellow of the Royal Microscopical Society in 1872; he was president of the society from 1888 to 1890, and an honorary fellow from 1901 until his death.

With Philip Henry Gosse he published in 1886 and 1889 the three-volume The Rotifera: or Wheel-Animalcules. In recognition of this, the standard monograph on the subject, he was elected Fellow of the Royal Society in 1889. Lord Avebury (Pleasures of Life, ch. 9) quotes the charming introduction of this work as showing that the true naturalist was no mere dry collector. Hudson's natural gift for drawing found expression in the illustrations of The Rotifera.

Hudson died in Shanklin on 23 October 1903, and was buried there. He married on 19 June 1855 Mary Ann Tibbits, and they had one daughter, Florence; his second marriage on 24 June 1858, at Clifton, was to Louisa Maria Fiott Hammond, and they had four sons and five daughters. An obituary was published in the Journal of the Royal Microscopical Society.

== The Hudson Transparencies ==
The Hudson Transparencies are a collection of 58 large framed manila paper screens made by Hudson, circa 1880s, as teaching aids. Shapes were cut out of the manila paper and decorated with tissue paper, which was painted with watercolour designs. When the transparencies are backlit, striking images of microscopic organisms become apparent. The Hudson Transparencies are held in the University of Exeter Special Collections Department, reference number EUL MS 442.

A study of the transparencies was carried out in 2011 by Robin Wootton for an article in the Report and Transactions of the Devonshire Association 143, where the transparencies were catalogued for the first time and twenty illustrated.
