= Royal Microscopical Society =

Learned society for the promotion of microscopy

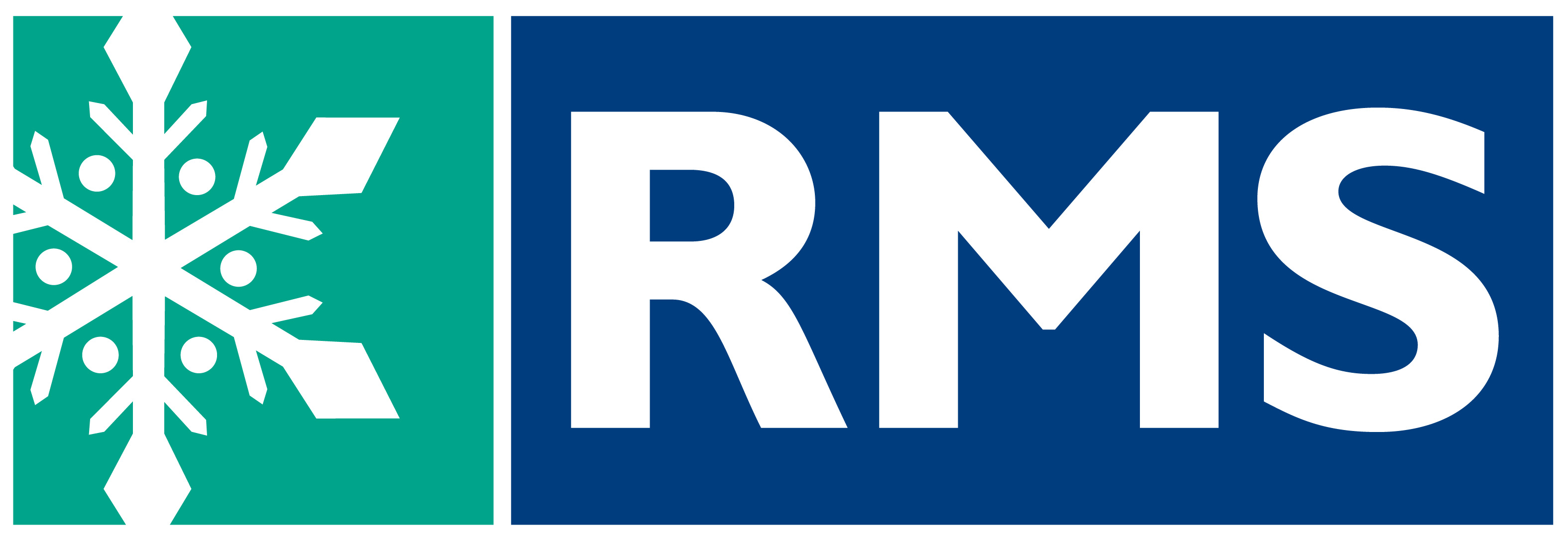
- Founded: September 1839, Royal Charter in 1866
- Type: Professional organisation and registered charity
- Registration no.: 241990
- Purpose: to promote the advancement of microscopical science by such means as the discussion and publication of research into improvements in the construction and mode of application of microscopes and into those branches of science where microscopy is important.
- Location(s): 37–38 St. Clements Street, Oxford, England, OX4 1AJ
- Coordinates: 51.750374°N 1.2422313°W
- Origins: Microscopical Society of London
- Region served: UK, worldwide
- Members: 1379
- Key people: President Peter J O'Toole; Vice President Grace Burke; Vice President Rik Brydson; Patrons: *Baroness Finlay of Llandaff *Baroness Brown of Cambridge
- Revenue: £1,639,504 (year ending Dec 2015
- Employees: 17
- Volunteers: 100
- Website: www.rms.org.uk

The Royal Microscopical Society (RMS) is a learned society for the promotion of microscopy. It was founded in 1839 as the Microscopical Society of London making it the oldest organisation of its kind in the world. In 1866, the Society gained its royal charter and took its current name. Founded as a society of amateurs, its membership consists of individuals of all skill levels in numerous related fields from throughout the world. Every year since 1841, the Society has published its own scientific journal, the Journal of Microscopy, which contains peer-reviewed papers and book reviews. The Society is a registered charity that is dedicated to advancing science, developing careers and supporting wider understanding of science and microscopy through its Outreach activities.

Probably the Society's greatest contribution is its standardised 3x1 inches microscope glass slides in 1840, which are still the most widely used size today and known as the "RMS standard".

The Royal Microscopical Society is a member of the Foundation for Science and Technology, the European Microscopy Society and the International Federation of Societies for Microscopy.

== History ==
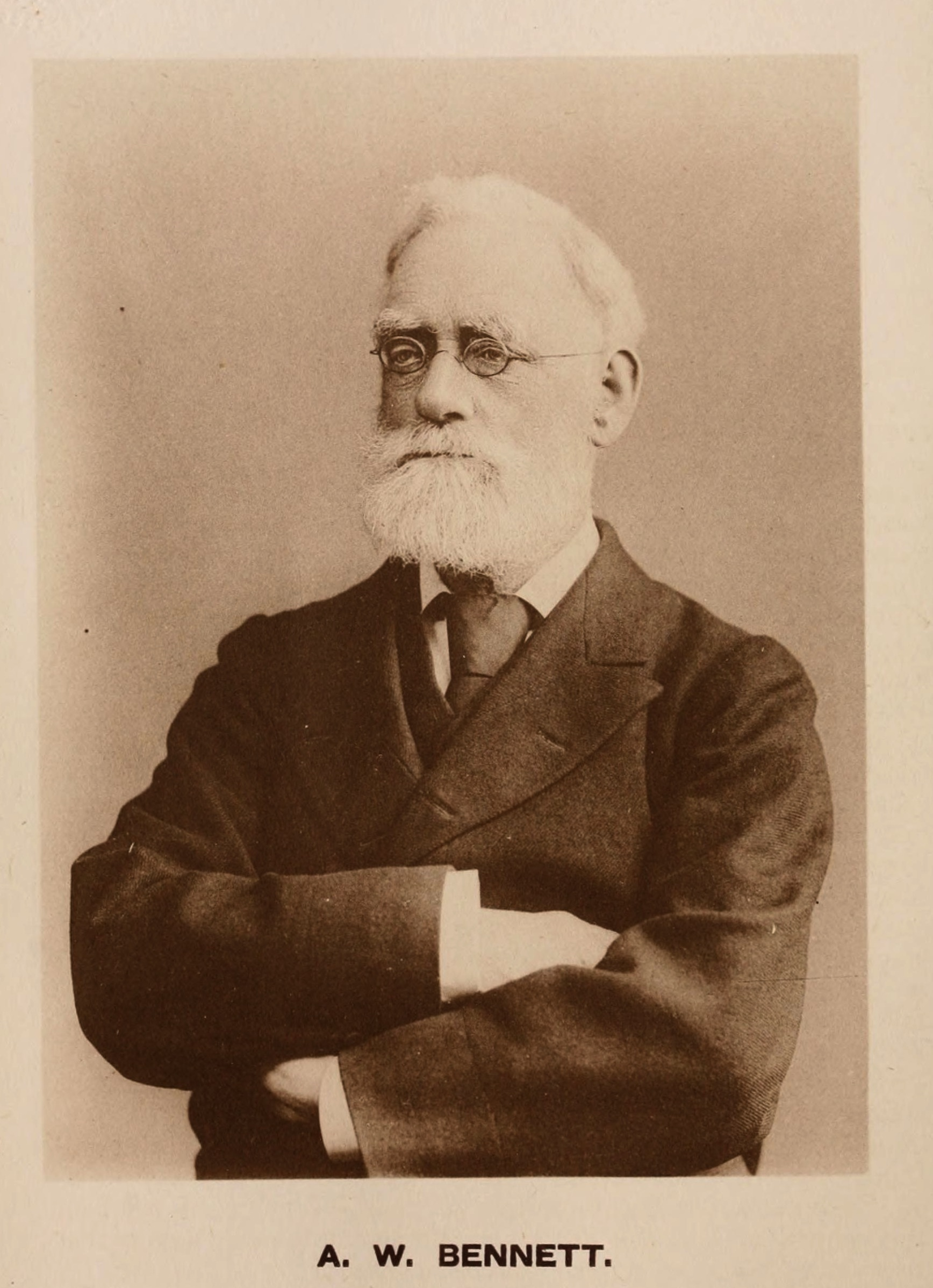
Alfred William Bennett, botanist, publisher, early vice-president and editor of the Journal of Microscopy from 1897 until his death in 1902.

On 3 September 1839, a meeting of 17 gentlemen including physicist Joseph Jackson Lister, photography pioneer Joseph Bancroft Reade, the botanists Edwin John Quekett and Richard Kippist, and artist and inventor Cornelius Varley, was held at Quekett's residence at 50 Wellclose Square "to take into consideration the propriety of forming a society for the promotion of microscopical investigation, and for the introduction and improvement of the microscope as a scientific instrument", following a decade of great advances in the field of microscopy. At this gathering it was agreed that a society should be founded and a committee appointed. It was named the Microscopical Society of London and a constitution was drawn up. On 20 December 1839, a public meeting was held at the Horticultural Society's rooms at 21 Regent Street in London. At the convention, Professor Richard Owen was elected president, along with Nathaniel Ward as Treasurer, and Farre as Secretary. A Council was also appointed, consisting of J.S. Bowerbank, Thomas Edwards, Dr F. Farre, George Gwilt, George Jackson, Dr John Lindley, George Loddiges, the Rev. C. Pritchard, Edwin John Quekett, M.J. Rippingham, Richard Horsman Solly and Robert Warington. With them, forty-five men were enrolled as members.

At its foundation, the Society acquired the best microscopes then obtainable from the three leading makers, Powell & Lealand, Ross, and Smith. The first president of the Society was palaeontologist Sir Richard Owen, who is best known for coining the word "dinosaur" and for his role in the creation of London's Natural History Museum. It was renamed the Royal Microscopical Society in 1866, when the Society received its Royal Charter under the Presidency of James Glaisher. Its governing documents are its Charter and By-laws.

In 1870, the President, Rev. Joseph Bancroft Reade, in his maiden speech revealed that he had suggested adding the suffix "-al" to the name of the fledgling society to prevent "the possibility of ourselves being mistaken for microscopic objects".

John Thomas Quekett (brother of co-founder Edwin John Quekett) served as the Society's secretary from 1841 to 1860. Distinguished botanist Dukinfield Henry Scott served as president of the Society between 1904 and 1906

In 1885, botanist and women's rights campaigner Marian Farquharson, became the first female Fellow of the Society. Although not permitted to attend meetings, her greatest contribution to the scientific community was of her campaign in gaining women rights to full fellowship of learned societies. In 1900 she sent a letter addressed to the Royal Society and the Linnean Society petitioning that "duly qualified women should be eligible for ordinary Fellowship and, if elected, there should be no restriction forbidding their attendance at meetings". Both societies refused her requests to join, eventually the Linnean Society elected her as a fellow in 1908.

In September 1989, Royal Mail released a set of four stamps to mark the celebration of the Society's 150th anniversary entitled "Microscopes", one of which being the snowflake, its own logo.

In 2017, the Society appointed two patrons, Baroness Brown of Cambridge and Baroness Finlay of Llandaff, both of whom are members of the House of Lords.

== Membership ==
RMS members come from a wide range of backgrounds within the biological and physical sciences, covering all areas of microscopy and cytometry.

After three years of continuous Ordinary Membership, members are invited to become a Fellow of the Society after a set number of criteria have been met, which allows for individuals to benefit from voting and election rights as well as the use of the post-nominal letters FRMS after their names.

=== Honorary Fellows ===
The Society's by-laws previously limited the number of Honorary Fellowships to a maximum of 65 at any one time. However, a proposal to enable new Fellowships to be awarded beyond this figure was approved at the 2019 AGM, and subsequently by the Privy Council.

=== Trustees ===
The Society has 23 Trustees including: Professor Maddy Parsons, a Professor of Cell Biology in the Randall Centre for Cell & Molecular Biophysics at King's College London, Professor Michelle Peckham, President of the Society from 2016-2019 and Peter J. O'Toole, current President of the Society (from 2023).

=== Presidents ===
The current President is Peter J. O'Toole.

The Society had a number of eminent scientists as President since its founding in 1839. Notable former Presidents include:.

- 2019-23 Grace Burke
- 2016-19 Michelle Peckham
- 2013-16 Peter Nellist
- 1984-5 Archibald Howie, MA, PhD, FRS
- 1966 HRH Prince Philip, Duke of Edinburgh
- 1930-1 R. Ruggles Gates, MA, PhD, LLD, FLS, FRS (first husband of Marie Stopes)
- 1926-7 James A. Murray, MD, BSc, FRS
- 1916-17 Edward Heron-Allen, FLS, FGS, FRS
- 1913-15 Sir German Sims Woodhead, MA, MD, LLD, FRSE
- 1911-12 Henry George Plimmer, FLS, FZS, FRS
- 1910-11 Sir J. Arthur Thomson, MA, FRSE
- 1909 Sir Edwin Ray Lankester, KCB, MA, LLD, FLS, FRS
- 1907-8 The Rt Hon. Lord Avebury, PC, DCL, LLD, FRS
- 1904-6 Dukinfield Henry Scott, MA, PhD, LLD, FLS, FRS
- 1902-3 Henry Woodward, LLD, FGS, FZS, FRS
- 1900-1 William Carruthers, FLS, FGS, FRS
- 1891-2 Robert Braithwaite, MD, MRCS
- 1888-90 Charles Thomas Hudson, MA, LLD, FRS
- 1884-7 Rev. William Henry Dallinger, MA, LLD, FRS
- 1881-3 Peter Martin Duncan, MB, FRS
- 1879-80 Lionel Smith Beale, MB, FRCP, FRS
- 1878 Henry James Slack, FGS
- 1875-7 Henry Clifton Sorby, LLD, FRS
- 1873-4 Charles Brooke, MA, FRS
- 1871-2 William Kitchen Parker, FRS
- 1869-70 Rev. Joseph Bancroft Reade, MA, FRS
- 1865-8 James Glaisher, FRS
- 1860 John Thomas Quekett, FRS
- 1858-9 Edwin Lankester, MD, LLD, FRS
- 1856-7 George Shadbolt
- 1854-5 William Benjamin Carpenter, CB, MD, LLD, FRS
- 1850-1 Arthur Farre, MD, FRS
- 1848-9 George Busk, FRS
- 1846-7 James Scott Bowerbank, LLD, FRS
- 1840-1 Sir Richard Owen, KCB, DCL, MD, LLD, FRS

== Publications ==
=== Journal of Microscopy ===
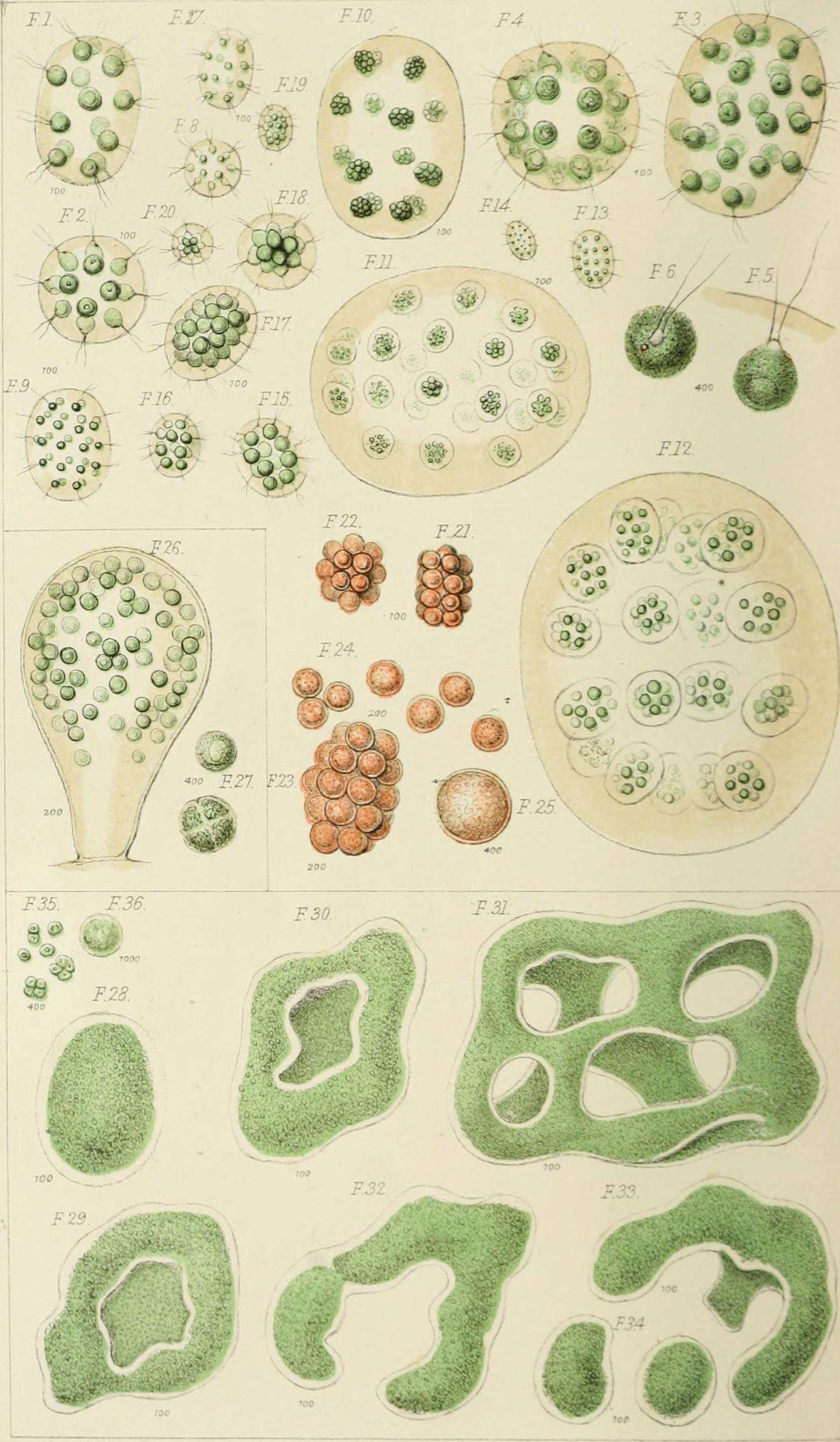
Illustration of Professor Henfreys paper on some Fresh-water Con-fervoid Algae, new to Britain (1853)

The Journal of Microscopy provides a forum for publication, discussion, and education for scientists and technologists who use any form of microscopy or image analysis. This includes technology and applications in physics, chemistry, material and biological sciences. The journal publishes review articles, original research papers, short communications, and letters to the editor, covering all aspects of microscopy. It is published on behalf of the Society by Wiley-Blackwell.

=== infocus Magazine ===
infocus Magazine is the Society's magazine for members. It provides a common forum for scientists and technologists from all disciplines which use any form of microscope, including all branches of microscopy and microbeam analysis. infocus features articles on microscopy related topics, techniques and developments, reports on RMS events, book reviews, news and much more. Published four times a year, infocus is free to members.

== Outreach activities ==
The Society is heavily involved with outreach activities, particularly those aimed at children, where the aim is to interest them in science as a whole as opposed to simply lab work. In late 2015, the Society was one of many "subject experts" consulted by awarding organisations as a part of a consultation by the Department for Education regarding reforms to the course content of the subject of Geology at GCE Advanced Level (A-level) in the national curriculum. Other advising parties included the British Geological Survey, the Natural History Museum and the Royal School of Mines.

=== Microscope Activity Kit Scheme ===
One such method is through the use of the Microscope Activity Kit Scheme starting in March 2011, a free scheme sending fully equipped Kits of microscopes and ready-to-go activities to Primary Schools throughout the United Kingdom and Ireland for a term at a time. By December 2014, the Kits had gone from 2 to 50 and had been used by over 20,000 children in the UK.

=== RMS Diploma ===
The RMS Diploma, launched in 2012 to replace the former RMS DipTech qualification, aims to help microscopists advance in their careers by improving and refining their skills to gain a distinguished qualification. The Diploma from the Royal Microscopical Society is attained via a flexible portfolio-based course of study that is designed by the candidate with the assistance of their line-manager, and with input from existing Fellows of the Society. This approach ensures that the study is both challenging and rewarding whilst fitting with, and complementing, the candidate's existing employment.

=== Courses and conferences ===
Each year the RMS hosts a programme of meetings, courses and conferences, including virtual (online) meetings. The Society's flagship event is the Microscience Microscopy Congress (mmc) Series, which usually takes place every two years. These events provide opportunities for keeping abreast of the latest developments and attract speakers and delegates active in all areas of science from forensics to flow cytometry, live cell imaging to SPM.

=== Gender equality ===
Since 2017 the RMS website has hosted a database of women working in microscopy to aid conference and meeting organisers in creating more diverse speaker line-ups for events. Scientists can either add themselves to the database or be nominated for inclusion.
