= Langport Railway Cutting =

Railway cutting in Somerset, England

- Site of Special Scientific Interest
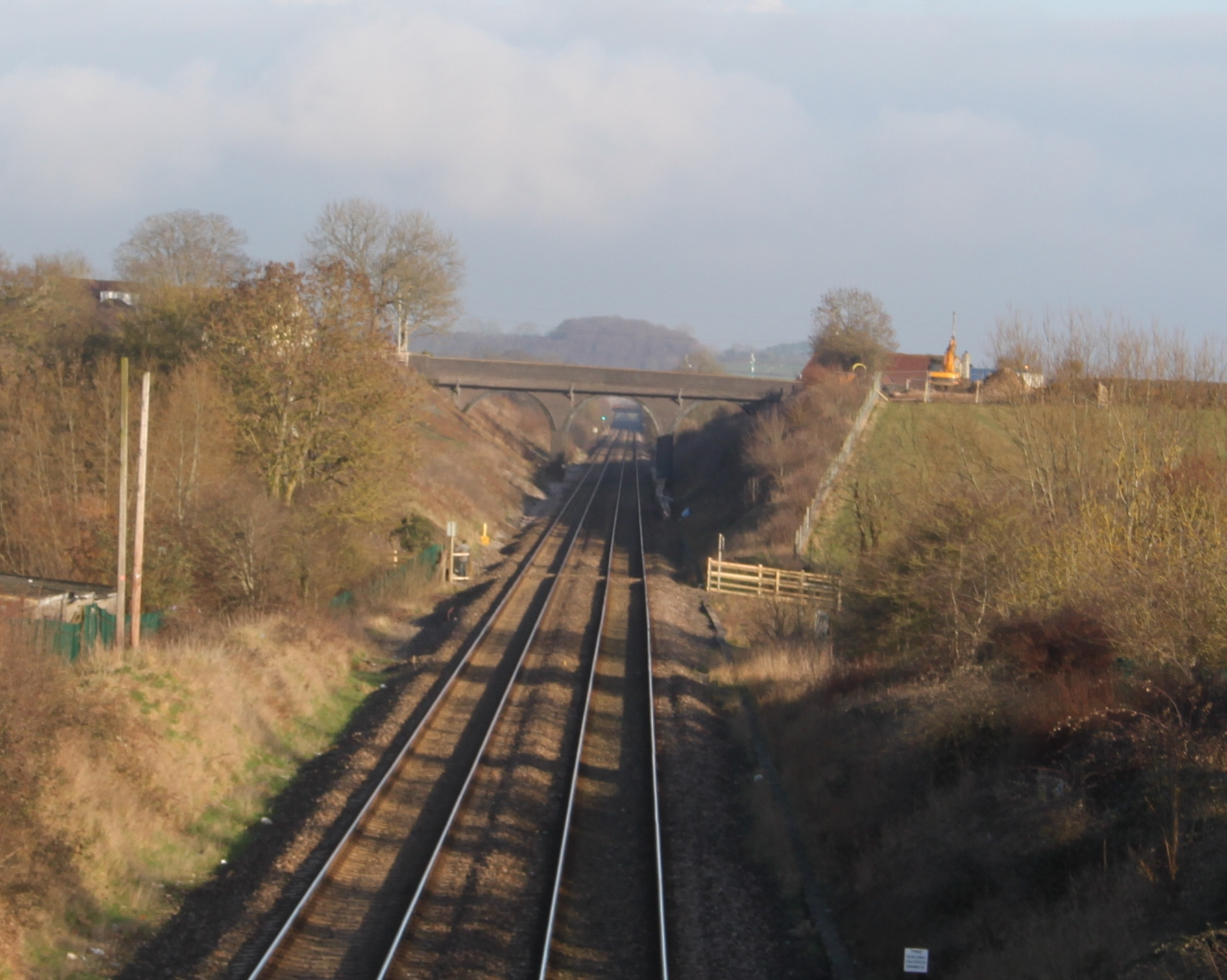

- Location within Somerset
- Location of Langport Railway Cutting.
- Area of search: Somerset
- Grid reference: ST427272
- Coordinates: 51.04128°N 2.81868°W
- Interest: Geological
- Area: 0.5 hectares (0.0050 km^{2}; 0.0019 sq mi)
- Notification date: 1992

Langport Railway Cutting (grid reference ST427272) is a 0.5 hectare geological Site of Special Scientific Interest at Langport in Somerset, England, notified in 1992. It is a Geological Conservation Review site.

Gravels exposed at Langport Railway Cutting show scour-and-fill structures consistent with braided stream deposition. This site is of importance as one of the few permanently exposed localities for coldstage Pleistocene gravels in south Somerset and more particularly because it is the first site in Britain in which typical calcrete features have been recorded. As such it is of national significance and has considerable research potential.

== Sources ==
- English Nature citation sheet for the site (accessed 10 August 2006)
