= Church of All Saints, Langport =

Church in Somerset, England

Church of All Saints
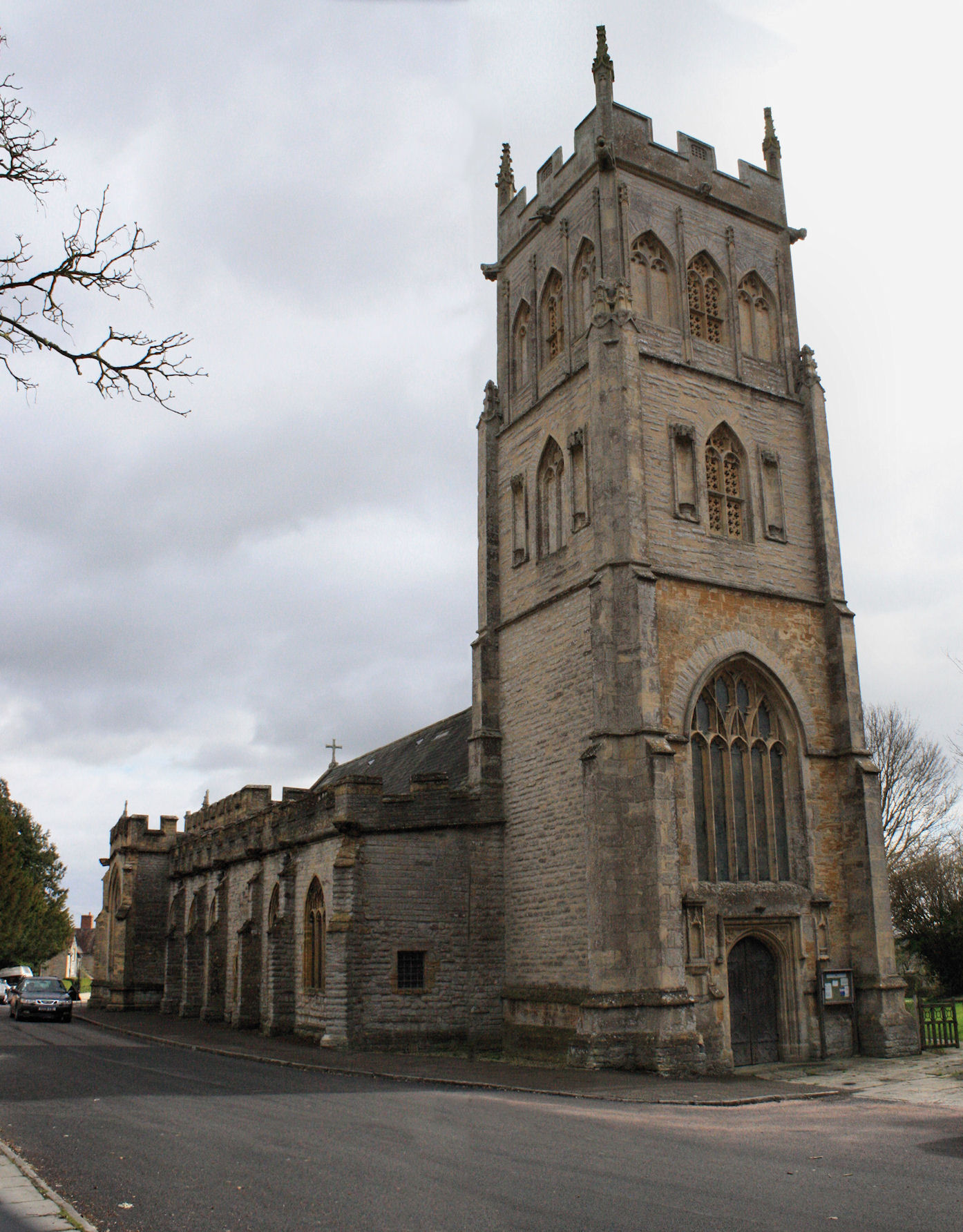

- Location within Somerset
- 51°02′14″N 2°49′31″W
- Location: Langport, Somerset, England

History
- Built: 15th century

Listed Building – Grade I
- Official name: Church of All Saints
- Designated: 17 April 1959
- Reference no.: 1056616

The Church of All Saints in Langport, Somerset, England, has 12th-century origins but was rebuilt in the late 15th century. It is recorded in the National Heritage List for England as a designated Grade I listed building.

== Architecture ==
The Perpendicular square tower, which is in three stages, dates from around 1455, but the top section was rebuilt in 1833. New aisles were added in 1499. It has a number of interesting gargoyles known locally as 'hunky punks'. The portcullis in the stonework above the battlements is from the coat of arms of Margaret Beaufort, Countess of Richmond and Derby who was Lord of the manor of Eastover in the Parish of Langport. Two of the hunky punks are believed to represent Margaret Beaufort and her son Henry VII of England.

The East window of the chancel contains a set of late 15th century glass depicting various saints, appropriate to the dedication "All Saints". Although restored in the 19th century, it remains one of the best preserved medieval windows in Somerset. Additionally, it is unusual in that the window contains a full set of glass from the same period.

== Usage ==
The church is used for occasional parish services, meaning its congregation has been merged with nearby St Mary's Huish, mother church of the Parish of Huish Episcopi cum Langport. It is now a redundant church in the care of the Churches Conservation Trust. The church was declared redundant on 1 July 1994, and was vested in the Trust on 28 June 1995. The Trust has carried out extensive rebuilding work.

In 2011, the Churches Conservation Trust and the community of Langport started an innovative regeneration project at All Saints church. Now the Regeneration Task-force at the Churches Conservation Trust is working in partnership with a group of local young people aged 16–25 to regenerate All Saints church with a new use. The group of young people is called the 'New Saints'.

== See also ==
- Grade I listed buildings in South Somerset
- List of Somerset towers
- List of churches preserved by the Churches Conservation Trust in Southwest England
