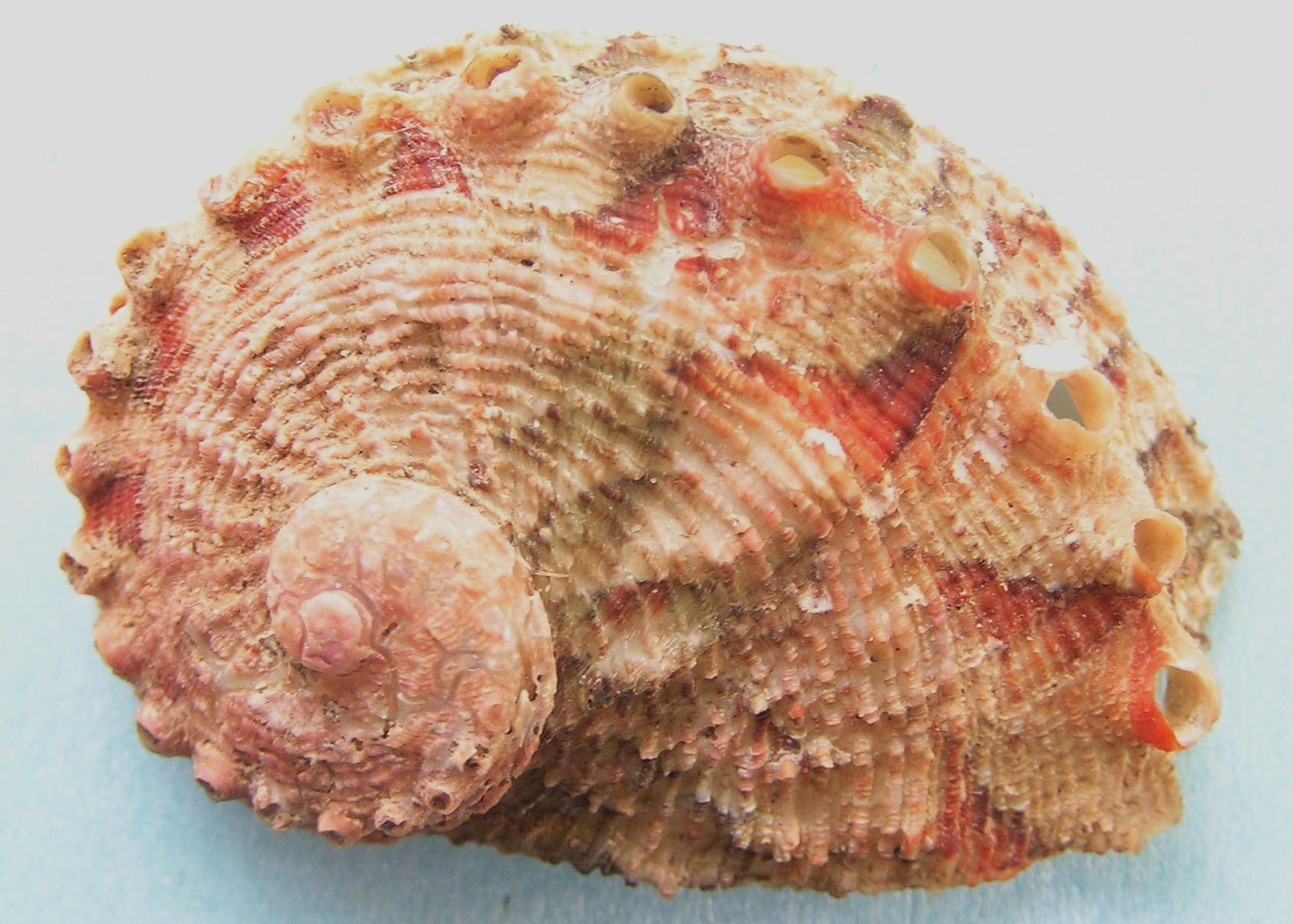
- Apical view of a shell of Haliotis queketti

Conservation status
- Data Deficient (IUCN 3.1)

Scientific classification
- Kingdom: Animalia
- Phylum: Mollusca
- Class: Gastropoda
- Subclass: Vetigastropoda
- Order: Lepetellida
- Family: Haliotidae
- Genus: Haliotis
- Species: H. queketti

Binomial name
- Haliotis queketti E.A. Smith, 1910

Synonyms
- Haliotis (Padollus) queketti E.A. Smith, 1910 (original combination)

= Haliotis queketti =

Species of gastropod

Haliotis queketti, common name Quekett's abalone, is a species of sea snail, a marine gastropod mollusk in the family Haliotidae, the abalone.

== Taxonomy ==
Halitosis quekketi was first formally described in 1910 as Haliotis (Padollus) queketti by the English malacologist Edgar Albert Smith with the type locality given as Isezela in Natal. This species is placed in the nominate subgenus of Haliotis rather than in the subgenusPadollus in which Smith originally classified it. The specific name honours the conchologist John Frederick Whitlie Quekett, curator of the Durban Museum of Natural History, who sent Smith the type of this species.

== Description ==
The size of the shell varies between 25 mm and 45 mm.

(Original description by E.A. Smith) "The depressed shell has an ovate shape with the raised ridge parallel to the row of holes only slightly raised. The upper surface exhibits numerous spiral lirae, minutely squamose through the close elevated lines of growth. The four open holes are rather prominent. The space between the holes and the outer margin is concave or channeled. The color of the shell is brownish-white with radiating blood-red streaks, narrow at the suture and gradually widening outwards. The left outer ledge is crossed by oblique, alternating, dark olive and pale stripes. The interior surface is beautifully iridescent, ridged and grooved. The columellar plate is whitish pearly, flattened, edged externally with a thin red line."

== Distribution and habitat ==
Haliotis queketti has been recorded with certainty only from Port Alfred in the Eastern Cape north to Port Durnford in KwaZulu-Natal and from Somalia, records of this rare species from the areas between these need confirmation. It is found at depths down to 15 m (49 ft) and little is known about its ecology. It is reported that specimens have been found buried under boulders or on hard surfaces within reefs.

== Conservation status ==
Haliotis queketti Is a rare species with little known about its biology, population and trends, the IUCN have, therefore, classed it as Data deficient.

== Utlisation ==
Haliotis queketti shells are occasionally found for sale on the international market for shell collectors.
