= Marian Farquharson =

British botanist, naturalist, women's rights activist

- Born: 2 July 1846; West Meon, Hampshire, England
- Died: 20 April 1912 (aged 65); Nice, France
- Resting place: Alford, Aberdeenshire
- Education: at home
- Spouse: Robert Francis Ogilvie Farquharson (m. 1883; died 1890)

Marian Sarah Ogilvie Farquharson, FLS, FRMS (née Ridley, 2 July 1846 – 20 April 1912) was a British naturalist and women's rights activist. The first female Fellow of the Royal Microscopical Society (although not permitted to attend meetings), Farquharson is best remembered for her campaign of women rights to full fellowship of learned societies.

== Early and personal life ==
Marian Sarah Ridley was born on 2 July 1846 in West Meon, Hampshire, England, the eldest daughter of Reverend Nicholas James Ridley and Frances Joucriet (d. 1901). She was a descendent of Bishop Nicholas Ridley. Educated at home, including lessons in music, she became interested in natural history.

In 1883, she married Robert Francis Ogilvie Farquharson from near Alford, Aberdeenshire. She moved to live with him on the Haughton estate. He died in May 1890 and she continued interests in both natural history and women's membership of learned societies.

== Scientific activity ==
She joined the Epping Forest and Essex Naturalists' Field Club in 1881; that same year, her book A Pocket Guide to British Ferns was published.

After moving to Scotland, she joined the Alford Field Club and East of Scotland Union of Naturalists' Societies. Two articles by Farquharson about ferns and mosses were published in the Scottish Naturalist. She also gave a presentation about them to the meeting of the British Association for the Advancement of Science in Aberdeen in 1885.

In 1885, she was elected the first female Fellow of the Royal Microscopical Society. Despite this, as a woman she was prohibited to attend any of its meetings or vote on Society's matters.

She was involved with the Congress of the International Council of Women, held in London in 1899, and contributed to the Biological Sciences section of the Congress.

== Women's rights ==
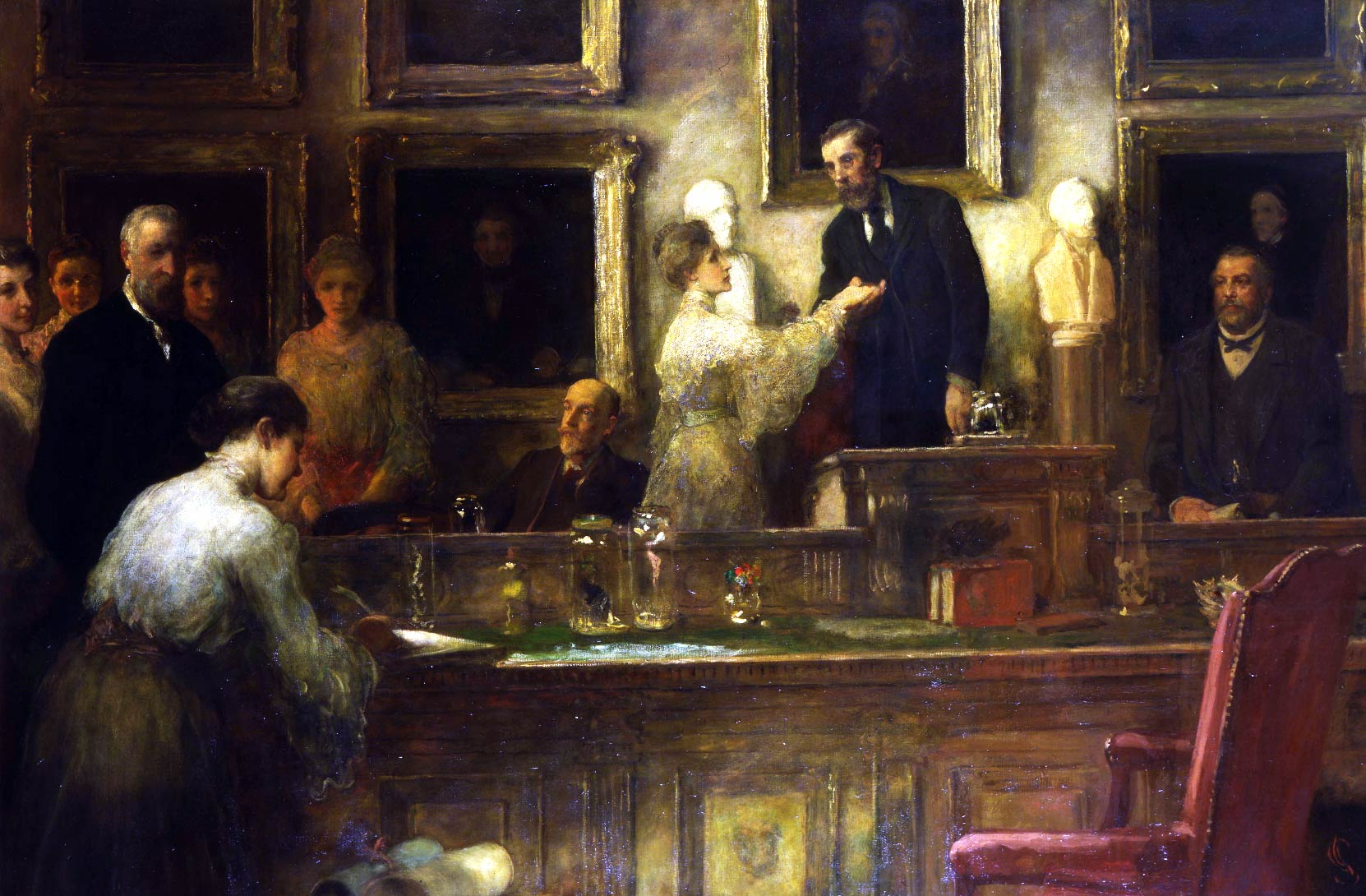
First admission of lady Fellows to the Linnean Society of London, 1906 painting of 1905 event, by James Sant

After her husband's death in 1890, Farquharson began active campaigning for women's rights for full fellowship and participation of learned societies. She founded and was president of the Scottish Association for Promotion of Women's Public Work.

In 1900, Farquharson sent a letter petitioning the Royal Society and the Linnean Society of London that "duly qualified women should have the advantages of full fellowship in scientific and other learned societies". The Linnean Society initially refused to accept the petition with the excuse that it could only accept one through one of its fellows. After its former president John Lubbock, 1st Baron Avebury resubmitted the petition on her behalf, the society eventually declined the proposal on the basis that it was doubtful its royal charter could be applied to women. A similar reply was also given by the Royal Society.

The following year, Farquharson petition of the Linnean Society intensified under it finally agreed for the petition to go before its fellows. In 1903, the Society decided to seek a supplementary charter from the King explicitly allowing women fellows. A ballot of fifteen women for fellowship finally took place in December 1904, where all but Farquharson were elected. Farquharson was not elected to the Society until 1908 when her nomination was resubmitted. However, as a result of her health, she never signed the Society's roll for admission thus was never formally admitted to the Linnean Society. She died in Nice on 20 April 1912.

== Works ==
In addition to her early interest in ferns and mosses, she developed an interest in desmids from 1883 onwards.

- A Pocket Guide to British Ferns (1881) (online)
- Notes on mosses of the north of Scotland in Scottish Naturalist, vol. 8, 1885–1886, p. 381 (online)
- Ferns and mosses of the Alford district in Scottish Naturalist, vol. 10, 1889–1890, pp. 193–198

== See also ==
- Timeline of women in science
