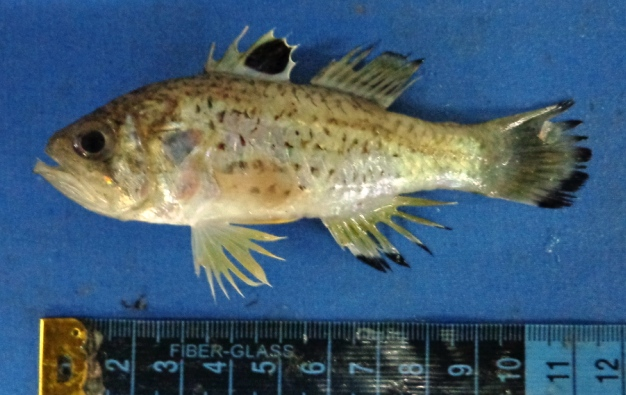

Scientific classification
- Domain: Eukaryota
- Kingdom: Animalia
- Phylum: Chordata
- Class: Actinopterygii
- Order: Gobiiformes
- Family: Apogonidae
- Genus: Jaydia
- Species: J. queketti

Binomial name
- Jaydia queketti (Gilchrist, 1903)

Synonyms
- Apogon queketti Gilchrist, 1903; Apogonichthys queketti (Gilchrist, 1903)

= Jaydia queketti =

Species of fish

Jaydia queketti, the spotfin cardinal or signal cardinalfish, is a species of ray-finned fish from the Indian Ocean, it is a member of the family Apogonidae. It has colonised the eastern Mediterranean Sea by way of the Suez Canal since 2004.

== Description ==
Jaydia queketti has a compressed, oblong body which is covered in large scales. It has two dorsal fins, the first one has 7 spines, with the 3rd and 4th being the largest. The soft rays in the dorsal fin are longer than the spines. The anal fin lines up with the 2nd dorsal fin origin. The caudal fin is round. The pelvic fin lies directly underneath and in line with the pectoral fin. The mouth is slightly oblique and reaches back beyond the large eye, which in turn has a diemeter of nearly four times the length of the head. The preopercular edge is smooth. The body colour is grey to off-white, darkening on the back. Dark grey to brown spots on the body form irregular, longitudinal lines. There is a large dark ocellus on the rear edge of the first dorsal fin while the posterior edge of the caudal fin and the lower edge of the anal fin are dark grey to black. The pectoral and pelvic fins are transparent but may be white. Normally 2–12 cm in length but can grow to 15 cm.

== Distribution ==
Jaydia queketti occurs in the western Indian Ocean from the Red Sea south to KwaZulu Natal, east to the Persian Gulf and India. It was first recorded in the Mediterranean Sea in Iskenderun Bay, Turkey, in 2004 and it has since spread from there southward to Israel and westward to the South Aegean Sea The most likely source of this invasion is through the Suez Canal from the Red Sea.

== Biology ==
Jaydia queketti is a nocturnal species which emerges into the water column at night to feed on zooplankton, hence the large eye, close to the substrate to a depth of 90m. During the day J. queketti hides in rocky habitat. It is a mouthbrooding species and there is some evidence of pairing behaviour.

== Taxonomy ==
Jaydia queketti was named in 1903 by the Scottish ichthyologist John Dow Fisher Gilchrist as a species in the genus Apogon. The genus Jaydia was split from Apogon with J. queketii being part of the carinatus species group along with Jaydia poecilopterus and Jaydia carinatus. Gilchrist did not specify who the specific name honours but it is thought to most likely be the conchologist John Frederick Whitlie Quekett (1849-1913) who was a curator of the Durban Natural History Museum.
