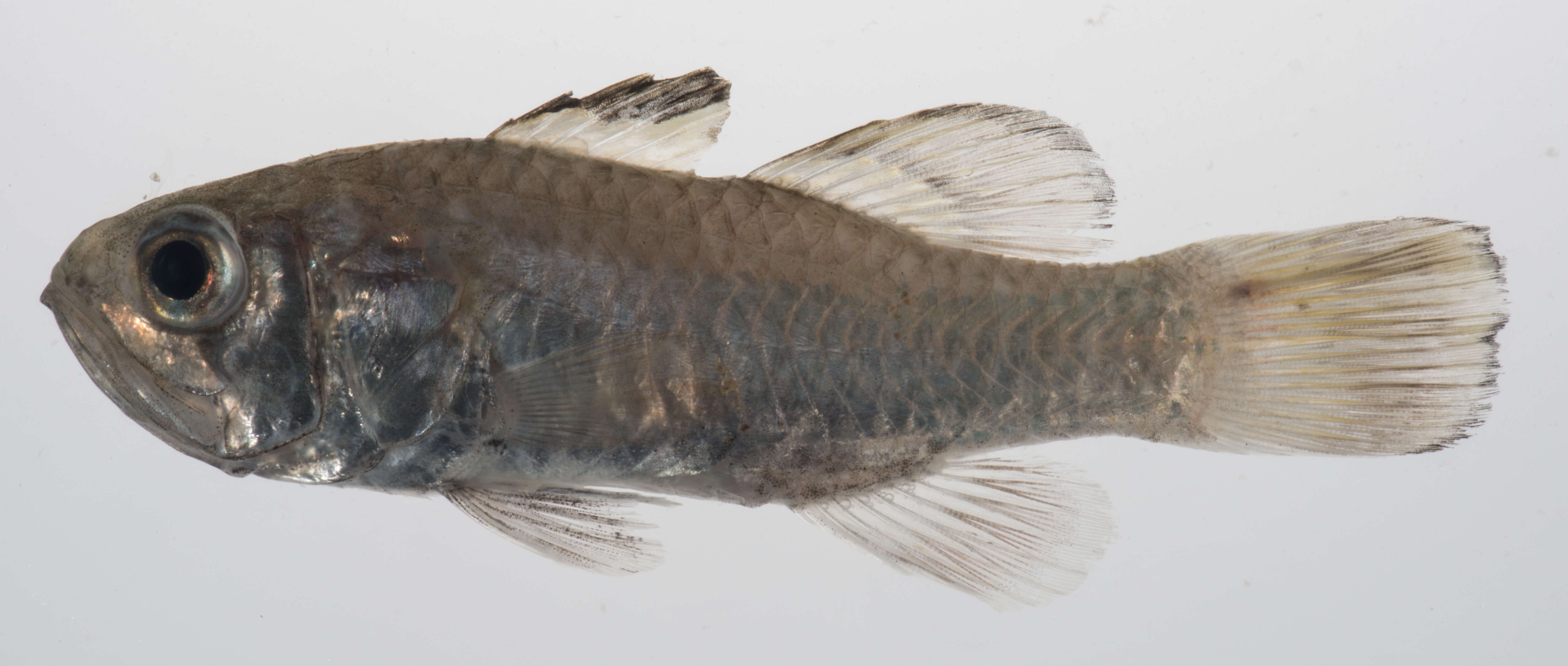

Scientific classification
- Kingdom: Animalia
- Phylum: Chordata
- Class: Actinopterygii
- Order: Gobiiformes
- Family: Apogonidae
- Genus: Jaydia
- Species: J. smithi

Binomial name
- Jaydia smithi Kotthaus, 1970

Synonyms
- Apogon smithi (Kotthaus, 1970); Jaydia hungi Fourmanoir, 1967

= Jaydia smithi =

Species of fish

Jaydia smithi, Smith's cardinalfish, is a species of ray-finned fish from the Indian and Pacific Oceans, a member of the family Apogonidae. It has colonised the eastern Mediterranean Sea by way of the Suez Canal since 2007.

== Description ==
J. smithi has a slightly compressed, oblong body with two dorsal fins, the first having a deeply notched membrane with the third and fourth spines being the longest. The second dorsal fin is much taller than the first. The anal fin starts slightly behind the front edge of second dorsal fin. The caudal fin is rounded, but may be truncated. The mouth is slightly oblique and terminal, and stretches back to line up with the rear margin of the large eye. The preoperculum edge is serrated, with three to seven flat, small serrations at the angle of the lower rear border. The scales are large and finely ctenoid. The lateral line has 24-26 scales and the one or two scales at the base of the caudal fin lack pores. It is light tan in colour, becoming paler towards the whitish belly, with five or six faint, dark bars which fade completely in larger specimens. The front portion of the front dorsal fin is black with a series of black dots forming a line on the lower third of the rear dorsal fin. The outer margins of the second dorsal and the rear margins of the caudal fins are black. The pectoral fins and pelvic fins are transparent, darkening from white to light grey as the animal grows. Normally between 4–10 cm in length, they have a maximum length of 15 cm.

== Distribution ==
J. smithi has an Indo-Pacific distribution from the Red Sea to the Marshall Islands, north to Taiwan and south to Indonesia. It was first recorded in the Mediterranean Sea off Jaffa, Israel, in 2007 and it has since become established all the way to the Anatolian coast of Turkey and off Egypt. It was likely introduced from the Red Sea, via the Suez Canal.

== Biology ==
Smith's cardinalfish is a nocturnal species that hides among rocks and reefs during the day and emerges at night to feed on invertebrates over sandy to muddy substrate at depths of 30–50 m. It spawns during the warmer months and is a mouthbrooding species, which shows pairing behavior during courtship and spawning; the males are responsible for incubating the eggs. An organ produces bioluminescence in the abdomen.

== Name ==
The specific name honours the South African ichthyologist James Leonard Brierley Smith (1897-1968), who in 1961 wrote a monograph on the cardinalfishes of the Indian Ocean in which he proposed the genus Jaydia.
