= George Gulliver =

English anatomist and physiologist

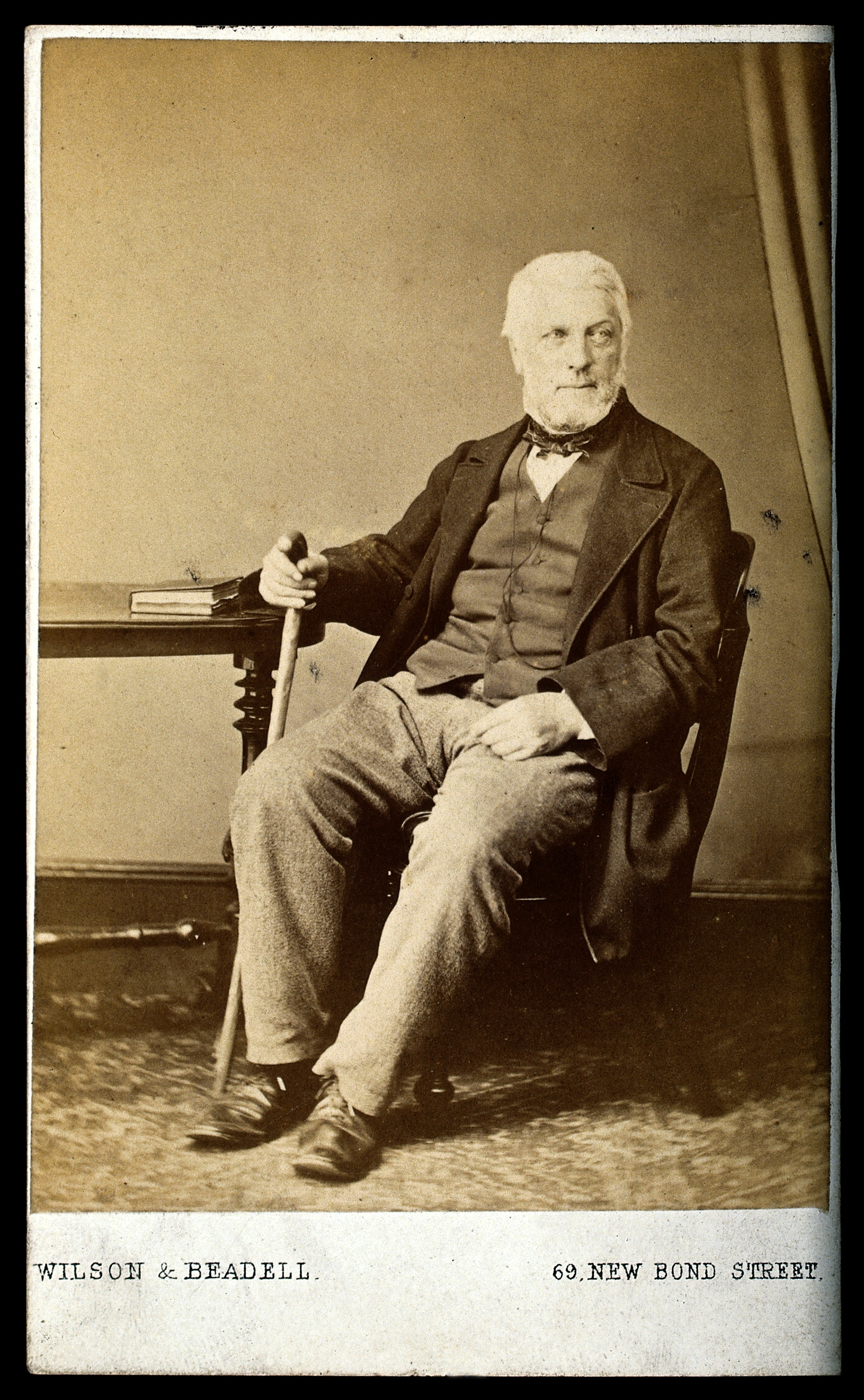
- Born: 4 June 1804; Banbury, Oxfordshire
- Died: 17 November 1882 (aged 78); Canterbury

George Gulliver (4 June 1804 – 17 November 1882), was an English anatomist and physiologist.

== Life and work ==
Gulliver was born at Banbury, Oxfordshire, on 4 June 1804, and after an apprenticeship with local surgeons entered at St. Bartholomew's Hospital, London, where he became prosector to Abernethy and dresser to Lawrence (afterwards Sir William). Becoming a Member of the Royal College of Surgeons in June 1826 he was gazetted hospital assistant to the forces in May 1827, and afterwards became surgeon to the Royal Horse Guards (the Blues).

He was elected a Fellow of the Royal Society in 1838, Fellow of the Royal College of Surgeons in 1843, and in 1852 a member of the council of the latter body. In 1861 he was Hunterian professor of comparative anatomy and physiology, and in 1863 delivered the Hunterian oration, in which he strongly put forward the neglected claims of William Hewson and John Quekett as discoverers.

For some years before his death he had retired from the army, and devoted himself to research and writing, but became gradually enfeebled by gout. Many of his later papers were written when he was confined to his bed. He died at Canterbury on 17 November 1882, leaving one son, George, assistant physician to St. Thomas' Hospital.

Gulliver wrote no systematic work, although he edited an English translation of Gerber's General and Minute Anatomy of Man and the Mammalia in 1842, adding, besides numerous notes, an appendix giving an account of his own researches on the blood, chyle, lymph, &c. In 1846 he edited for the Sydenham Society The Works of William Hewson, F.R.S., with copious notes and a biography of Hewson. He also supplied notes to Rudolph Wagner's Physiology, translated by Dr. Willis (1844). His Hunterian lectures on the "Blood, Lymph, and Chyle of Vertebrates" were published in the Medical Times and Gazette from 2 August 1862 to 13 June 1863. Most of his work is scattered through various periodicals; a list of them is given in the Royal Society's Catalogue of Scientific Papers. Gulliver was the first to give extensive tables of measurements and full observations on the shape and structure of the red blood-corpuscles in man and many vertebrates, resulting in several interesting discoveries. In some points he corrected the prevailing views adopted from John Hunter as to the coagulation of the blood, at the same time confirming other views of Hunter; he noted the fibrillar form of clot fibrin, the so-called molecular base of chyle, the prevalence of naked nuclei in chyle and lymph, and the intimate connection of the thymus gland with the lymphatic system. His work in connection with the formation and repair of bone had considerable significance. To pathology he rendered important services, showing the prevalence of cholesterine and fatty degeneration in several organs and morbid products, the significance of the softening of clots of fibrin, and some of the characteristics of tubercle. In botany also Gulliver did original work, proving the important varieties of character in raphides, pollen, and some tissues, and their taxonomic value.
