= The Hanging Chapel =

Chantry Chapel of the Blessed Virgin Mary
- The Hanging Chapel
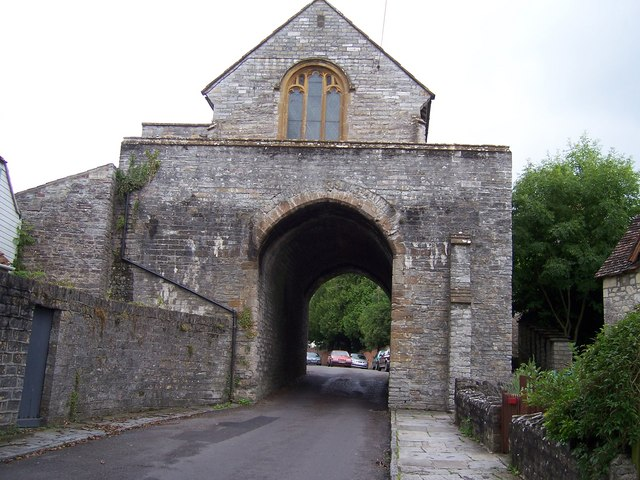

- Location within Somerset
- 51°02′11″N 2°49′30″W
- Location: Langport, Somerset, England

History
- Built: 13th century

Listed Building – Grade I
- Official name: The Hanging Chapel
- Designated: 17 April 1959
- Reference no.: 1056615

Scheduled monument
- Official name: The Hanging Chapel and a medieval gateway at The Hill
- Designated: 3 July 2000
- Reference no.: 1019290

The Hanging Chapel, more formally known as the Chantry Chapel of the Blessed Virgin Mary, in Langport, Somerset, England, is a 13th-century archway, bearing a Perpendicular building known as the hanging chapel. It has been designated as a Grade I listed building, and a Scheduled Ancient Monument.

== History ==
Excavation in the 1990s showed that the gateway and chapel had been built on the site of a Saxon bank around the town. The archway is all that remains of the east gate of the defended town. The archway which goes over the former main road takes the form of a pointed barrel vault.

After the Reformation, having served as the chapel of the tradesmen's guild of Langport who also formed the Corporation, it briefly served as a town hall in the late 16th century, and also became a courthouse at around the same time.

It was given by the corporation to the trustees of Thomas Gillett's free grammar school, and underwent repairs in 1706 and 1716 to house the town's grammar school, which had been founded in 1675. The grammar school used the premises until 1790, and the chapel was then used as a Sunday school from 1818 to 1827.

It then became the Quekett museum, named after John Thomas Quekett (1815–61) the histologist, one of the sons of William Quekett, master of Langport Grammar School, holding Edward Quekett's collection of stuffed birds from 1834 to 1875. It has also been an armoury.

The hanging chapel became a masonic hall in 1891, and is currently leased by the town council to the Portcullis Lodge.

== Incidents ==
In 1998 long scars, 10 millimetres (0.39 in) to 15 millimetres (0.59 in) deep, were left in the archway when it was hit by a lorry, although no structural damage occurred. In April 2022, more serious damage was caused when another lorry got wedged in the archway while trying to pass through. Several stones were loosened and repairs weren't completed till September.

== See also ==
- List of Grade I listed buildings in South Somerset
