= Peter J. O'Toole =

British biologist

Peter John O'Toole
- Education: University of Essex (B.Sc, Ph.D.)
- Known for: Microscopy, Teaching, Outreach
- Scientific career
- Fields: Microscopy; Flow Cytometry
- Workplaces: Royal Microscopical Society; University of York; University of Essex (Postdoc)
- Thesis: Spectrin-lipid interactions: investigations by fluorescence spectroscopy and digital fluorescence microscopy (1998)
- Website: O'Toole's Research Profile

Peter John O'Toole is a British biologist who is the Director of the Bioscience Technology Facility and the Head of Imaging and Cytometry at University of York. Since 2023, O'Toole has served as the president of the Royal Microscopical Society.

== Education ==
O'Toole completed his undergraduate studies in biology at the University of Essex, where he earned his Ph.D. in Biochemistry and Cellular Biophysics in 1998. During his Ph.D. studies in the laboratory of Richard Cherry, he was involved in many aspects of fluorescence imaging and flow cytometry.

== Career and research ==
Before starting his position as Head of Imaging and Cytometry at the University of York in 2022, O'Toole underwent his postdoctoral training at University of Essex with Richard Cherry.

As head of Imaging and Cytometry and, since 2016, also as director of the Bioscience Technology Facility at University of York, O'Toole is responsible for supervising the Imaging and Cytometry laboratories, which are equipped with various confocal microscopes, flow cytometers, and electron microscopes. O'Toole's team collaborates with leading microscopy and cytometry companies, providing research assistance and consultancy services to academic and commercial organizations.

O'Toole's research is currently focused on both technology and method development of novel probes and imaging modalities.

In addition to his responsibilities in managing facilities and research, O'Toole plays important roles in several organizations, including the Royal Microscopical Society, Core Technologies for Life Sciences, and the European Light Microscopy Initiative (ELMI). He is also actively involved in teaching activities, such as the RMS Light Microscopy Summer School and the RMS Practical Flow Cytometry courses.

Since 2020, O'Toole has hosted "The Microscopists" podcast, a podcast from Bitesize Bio sponsored by ZEISS Microscopy. During the podcast, O'Toole interviews microscopists about their careers and lives outside work.

Since 2023, O'Toole has held the position of President at the Royal Microscopical Society, succeeding Professor Grace Burke, who had been serving since 2019.
