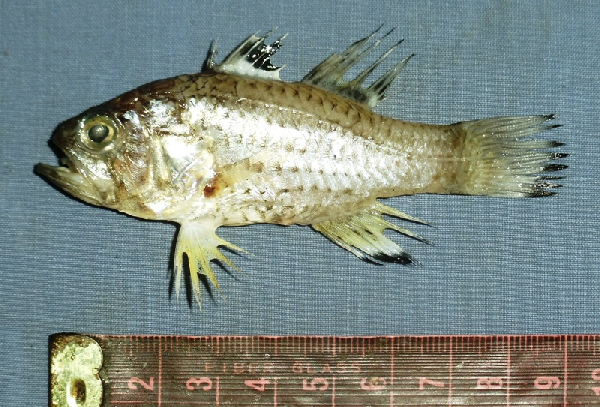
- Jaydia queketti

Scientific classification
- Kingdom: Animalia
- Phylum: Chordata
- Class: Actinopterygii
- Order: Gobiiformes
- Family: Apogonidae
- Subfamily: Apogoninae
- Genus: Jaydia; J. L. B. Smith, 1961

Type species
- Apogon ellioti Day 1875

= Jaydia =

Genus of fishes

Jaydia is a genus of fishes in the family Apogonidae native to the western Pacific Ocean.

== Species ==
The 18 recognized species in this genus are:

- Jaydia albomarginatus (H. M. Smith & Radcliffe, 1912)
- Jaydia argyrogaster (M. C. W. Weber, 1909) (silver-mouth cardinalfish)
- Jaydia carinatus (G. Cuvier, 1828) (ocellated cardinalfish)
- Jaydia catalai (Fourmanoir, 1973)
- Jaydia erythrophthalma Gon, Y. C. Liao & K. T. Shao, 2015
- Jaydia hungi (Fourmanoir & Do-Thi, 1965)
- Jaydia lineata (Temminck & Schlegel, 1843) (Indian cardinalfish)
- Jaydia melanopus (M. C. W. Weber, 1911) (monster cardinalfish)
- Jaydia novaeguineae (Valenciennes, 1832)
- Jaydia photogaster (Gon & G. R. Allen, 1998) (silver-belly cardinalfish)
- Jaydia poecilopterus (G. Cuvier, 1828) (pearly-finned cardinalfish)
- Jaydia quartus (T. H. Fraser, 2000)
- Jaydia queketti (Gilchrist, 1903) (spot-fin cardinalfish)
- Jaydia smithi Kotthaus, 1970 (Smith's cardinalfish)
- Jaydia striata (H. M. Smith & Radcliffe, 1912)
- Jaydia striatodes (Gon, 1997)
- Jaydia tchefouensis (P. W. Fang, 1942)
- Jaydia truncata (Bleeker, 1855) (flag-fin cardinalfish)
- Jaydia? quilonica Carolin, Bajpai, Maurya & Schwarzhans, 2022 (otolith based fossil species, Burdigalian)
