= John Frederick Whitlie Quekett =

John Frederick Whitlie Quekett (b. London, 1849, d. Durban 5 July 1913) was a conchologist and museum curator who worked in South Africa, having emigrated there in 1871. He was the curator of the Durban Natural History Museum in June 1895. He retired in 1909 and died in Durban in 1913.

== Early life ==
Quekket was born in London in 1849, his father was Professor John Thomas Quekett, after whom the Microscopy Club, is named, and his mother was Isabella Mary Anne Scott. He was educated in London.

== South Africa ==
Quekket emigrated to South Africa in 1871. At some time in the early 1880s he was elected a Fellow of the Zoological Society of London. In 1886 he was tasked by the Natal Society in Pietermaritzburg to organise their collections and in 1888 was recorded as the honorary secretary of the Society’s Museum and Science Department. By 1891 he was the secretary and the first curator of the society’s museum, an institution which eventually became part of the Natal Museum. at this time he was employed by the civil service of Natal from 1889 and worked for its Forestry Department from its inauguration in 1891.

Quekett was appointed as curator of the Durban Natural History Museum in June 1895. He also the secretary and treasurer of the management committee of the museum. declining health forced him to retire from the museum in 1909. He specialised in conchology, and alongside H.C. Burnup, he undertook many field trips to collect shells. Quekket and Burnup were the first conchologists to retrieve shells from the intestines of the musselcracker seabream (Sparodon durbanensis). The shells were obtained fishmonger in Durban called Alex ("Lexy") Anderson. Quekett also had an interest in moths.

Quekket joined the South African Philosophical Society in 1899 and was still a member in 1908 when it changed into the Royal Society of South Africa.

Quekett died in Durban on 5 July 1913.

== Legacy ==
Quekett is honoured in the names of the following species:

- flapnose houndshark (Scylliogaleus quecketti) Boulenger, 1902 although Boulenger consistently misspelled Quekett's name as "Queckett".
- the lesser gurnard (Chelidonichthys queketti) (Regan, 1904)
- the spotfin cardinalfish (Jaydia queketti) (Gilchrist, 1903)
- the frog Rana quecketti (Boulenger, 1895) (see S. quecketti above)
- the bittersweet clam Glycymeris queketti (G. B. Sowerby III, 1897)
- Quekett's abalone (Haliotis queketti) E.A. Smith, 1910
- the land snail Gulella queketti (Melvill & Ponsonby, 1896)
- the predatory air-breathing "cannibal snail" Natalina quekettiana (Melvill & Ponsonby, 1893)
