= William Quekett =

William Quekett (3 October 1802 – 30 March 1888), rector of Warrington, Lancashire, the eldest brother of microscopists Edwin John and John Thomas Quekett, born at Langport, on 3 October 1802, entered St. John's College, Cambridge, in 1822, and, on his graduation, in 1825 was ordained as curate of South Cadbury, Somerset. In 1830 he became curate at St. George's-in-the-East, where he remained until 1841. To his efforts was due the establishment of the district church of Christ Church, Watney Street, of which he acted as incumbent from 1841 to 1854. His philanthropic energy here attracted the attention of Charles Dickens, who based upon it his articles on "What a London Curate can do if he tries" (Household Words, 16 November 1850) and "Emigration" (ib. 24 January 1852). In 1849 Quekett, with the co-operation of Sidney Herbert, founded the Female Emigration Society, in the work of which he took an active part. In 1854 he was presented by the crown to the rectory of Warrington, where he restored the parish church, and died on 30 March 1888, soon after the publication of a gossiping autobiography, My Sayings and Doings.
