= Quekett Microscopical Club =

Learned society promoting microscopy

- Named after: John Thomas Quekett
- Formation: June 14, 1865; 161 years ago
- Type: Nonprofit
- Headquarters: London
- Website: quekett.org

The Quekett Microscopical Club is a learned society for the promotion of microscopy. Its members come from all over the world, and include both amateur and professional microscopists. It is a registered charity and not-for-profit publisher, with the stated aims of promoting the understanding and use of the microscope.

== History ==
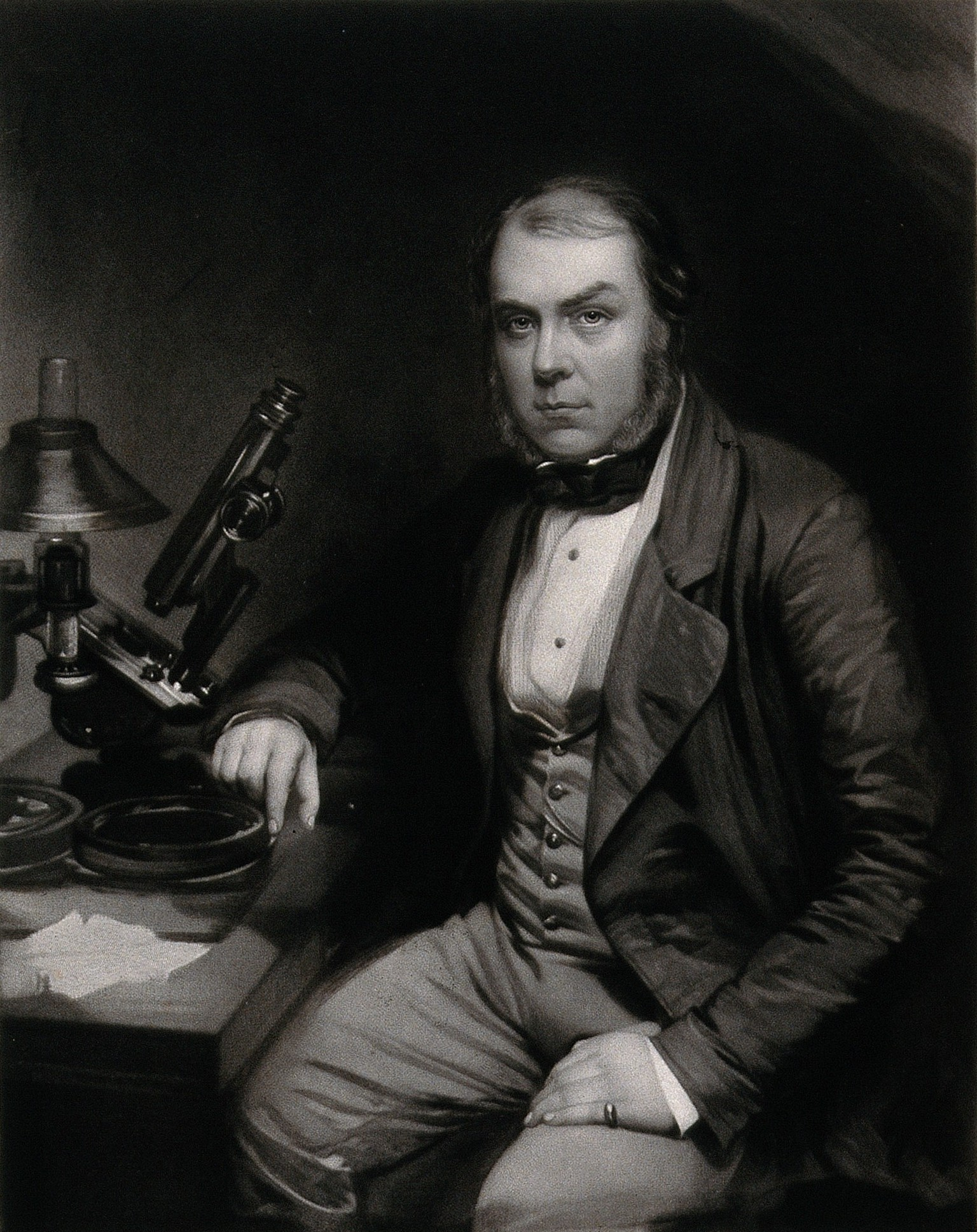
Portrait of John Thomas Quekett

The club was founded in 1865 as a result of a letter from W. Gibson published in Hardwicke's Science-Gossip in May 1865, which suggested that "some association among the amateur microscopists of London is desirable". At the time, the Microscopical Society of London (later the Royal Microscopical Society) catered mainly to experienced and professional microscopists, and the proposed club was intended to be more welcoming to beginners and amateurs.

The suggestion was taken up by Mordecai Cubitt Cooke, Thomas Ketteringham and Witham Bywater, who met on 14 June 1865 and agreed a provisional committee. About a month after Gibson's letter, a meeting was held at the offices of the publisher Robert Hardwicke, at which the Quekett Microscopical Club was formed.

About sixty people attended the first meeting of the club on Friday 7 July 1865, establishing the club to "give amateurs the opportunity of assisting each other, holding monthly meetings in a central locality, at an annual charge to cover incidental expenses". The word 'club' was chosen instead of 'society' to reflect the aims of the association. The first President was Edwin Lankester.

The club is named after the Victorian microscopist Professor John Thomas Quekett, and is the second oldest organisation in the world dedicated to microscopy, after the Royal Microscopical Society, founded in London in 1839. The club began publishing the Quekett Journal of Microscopy in 1868, and held its first practical classes in 1869.

The club remains active, continuing some of the traditions of the club’s Victorian founders, and welcomes anyone with an interest in microscopy, covering all aspects of the subject ranging from the history of the microscope and slide collecting to digital imaging.

== Presidents ==
Past presidents of the club have included:

President	Term
Edwin Lankester	1865–1866
Peter le Neve Foster	1869
Lionel Smith Beale	1870–1871
Robert Braithwaite	1872–1873
Henry Lee	1875–1877
Thomas Henry Huxley	1877–1879
Thomas Spencer Cobbold	1879–1880
Mordecai Cubitt Cooke	1881–1883
William Benjamin Carpenter	1883–1885
William Dallinger	1889–1892
George Edward Massee	1899–1903
Edward Alfred Minchin	1908–1912
Arthur Dendy	1912–1916
Alfred Barton Rendle	1916–1921
Sir David Prain	1924–1926
William Thomas Calman	1926–1928
John Ramsbottom	1928–1931
Hamilton Hartridge	1951–1954

== Membership ==
Members include amateurs, professionals, beginners and experts with an interest in microscopes, microscopy or microscope slides.

Members receive two issues of the Quekett Journal of Microscopy and two issues of the Bulletin of the Quekett Microscopical Club each year.

Members have access to a private area of the club’s website that includes meeting reports, videos of lectures, and galleries of entries from slide and photograph competitions.

== Meetings ==
The club holds monthly meetings in London for its members, normally in the Natural History Museum, and a few meetings in other parts of the United Kingdom. During the warmer months, the club arranges excursions where members can collect specimens and examine them using their own microscopes. The club holds an annual exhibition in the Natural History Museum each autumn. Reports of meetings are published in the club’s Bulletin and on its website.

== Publications ==
The club’s publications include the informal Bulletin of the Quekett Microscopical Club (available only to members), the peer-reviewed Quekett Journal of Microscopy which has been published in an unbroken run since 1868, and a range of books.
