= Thomas Edwards (legal writer) =

British legal writer

Thomas Edwards (c.1775–1845) was a British legal writer.

== Life ==
Edwards studied at Trinity Hall, Cambridge, where he proceeded to LL.B. in 1800 and LL.D. in 1805. He was also a fellow of Trinity Hall, and was admitted as an advocate at Doctors' Commons. Edwards was a magistrate for the county of Surrey, and took considerable interest in questions connected with the improvement of the people. He died at the Grove, Carshalton, on 20 October 1845.

== Works ==
- Reports of Cases argued and determined in the High Court of Admiralty; commencing with the Judgments of Sir William Scott, Easter Term, 1808, 1812; reprinted in America.
- A Letter to the Lord-lieutenant of the County of Surrey on the Misconduct of Licensing Magistrates and the consequent Degradation of the Magistracy, 1825.
- Reasons for Refusing to Sign the Lay Address to the Archbishop of Canterbury, 2nd edition, 1835 (concerning the ritual of the church)
