= Langport =

Town in Somerset, England

Coordinates: 51.037806°N 2.828514°W

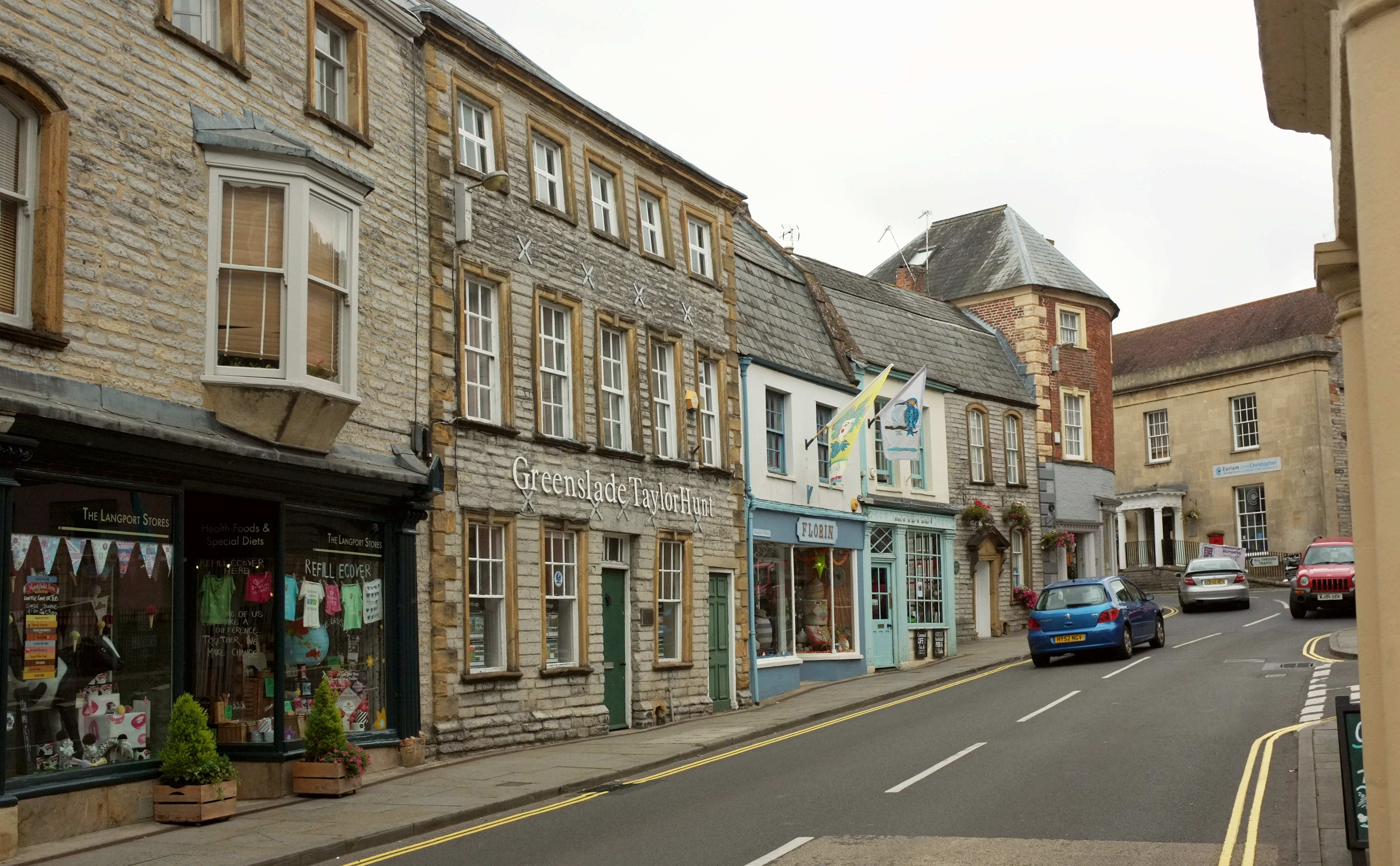
- Shops in the centre of Langport.

- Location within Somerset
- Population: 3,578
- OS grid reference: ST420268
- Unitary authority: Somerset
- Ceremonial county: Somerset
- Region: South West
- Country: England
- Sovereign state: United Kingdom
- Post town: LANGPORT
- Postcode district: TA10
- Dialling code: 01458
- Police: Avon and Somerset
- Fire: Devon and Somerset
- Ambulance: South Western
- UK Parliament: Glastonbury and Somerton

Langport is a town and civil parish in Somerset, England, 5 miles (8 km) west of Somerton. The parish, which covers only part of the town, has a population of 3,578. Langport is contiguous with Huish Episcopi, a separate parish that includes much of the town's outskirts.

== History ==
Langport (old forms are "Langeberga" and "Langeport") consists of two parts, one on the hill and one by the River Parrett. The former owed its origin to its defensible position, and the latter its growth to its facilities for trade on the chief river of Somerset. Eilert Ekwall translates it as "long town" or "long market". Its name looks like Anglo-Saxon for "long port", but it may be "long market place" that could have been on the causeway that is now Bow Street.

Many of the houses in Bow Street tilt backwards due to settlement of the land behind the causeway. It is speculated that Langport is the place mentioned in old Welsh sources as "Llongborth" = "Ship-port", the site of the Battle of Llongborth. "Longphort" is a term used in Ireland for a Viking ship enclosure or shore fortress, with an identical etymology. Langport was previously also known as Langport Eastover, with the part on the western bank being Langport Westover, now known just as Westover. Langport is on the ancient way from Glastonbury to Taunton.

Langport could have been important during the Roman occupation as there were several villas in the vicinity. It was one of the forts listed in the Burghal Hidage indicating its strategic position for King Alfred, as well as being close to the royal centre of Somerton. According to the Domesday Book of 1086, it had 34 resident burgesses and was worth the then large sum of £79 10s 7d.

The parish of Combe was part of the Kilmersdon Hundred, while Langport Eastover was within the Hundred of Pitney.

The first charter, granted by Elizabeth I in 1562, recognised that Langport was a borough of great antiquity, which had enjoyed considerable privileges, being governed by a portreeve. It was incorporated by James I in 1617, but the corporation was abolished in 1883. Langport was represented in Parliament in 1304 and 1306. In medieval times Langport was an important centre for cloth making.

The charter of 1562 granted three annual fairs to Langport, on 28 June, 11 November, and the second Monday in Lent. Only one fair is now held, a horse and cattle fair on 3 September. A Saturday market was held under the grant of 1562, but in the 19th century the market day was changed to Tuesday.

On 10 July 1645, the Battle of Langport was fought here, in which the last effective Royalist field army was destroyed and the Parliamentary victory in the Civil War became all but inevitable. When the Royalists retreated through the town many were killed by the bridge over the Parrett, and many of the buildings were set on fire. Although one authority states this was an act of the Parliamentary cavalry, reading contemporary accounts of the battle it is clear that the Royalist cavalry set the lower town on fire in the (vain) hope that this would hinder the pursuit led by Cromwell's cavalry.

In 1826 Langport was the birthplace of Walter Bagehot a businessman, essayist and journalist, who wrote extensively about literature, government, economic affairs and other topics. He went into partnership with George Stuckey and by 1866 the company owned 14 East Indiamen as well as 19 barges on the River Parrett. This developed into the Somerset Trading Company. Stuckey's Bank had been founded in 1770, and by 1909 its banknote circulation was second only to that of the Bank of England. It was then taken over by Parr's Bank, which became part of the Westminster Bank.

The Great Bow Bridge, which now carries the A378, is a three-arched bridge, constructed under the terms of the Parrett Navigation Act 1836. Completed in 1841 at a cost of £3,749, it replaced the previous medieval bridge, with its nine tiny arches, all too small to allow navigation. A bridge at this site was first mentioned in 1220. The medieval bridge consisted of a total of 31 arches, of which nine crossed the river, and 19 of the original arches were located by ground-penetrating radar in 1987, buried beneath the road which runs from Great Bow Bridge to Little Bow Bridge.

Around 1840 the Westport Canal was built, which joined the river at Langport. The abortive Ivelchester and Langport Navigation scheme had sought to avoid the Great Bow Bridge, by making the Portlake Rhine navigable, rebuilding Little Bow Bridge in the centre of Langport, and making a new cut to Bicknell's Bridge. Seven locks, each with a small rise, were planned but the scheme foundered in 1797, due to financial difficulties. The railway came to Langport in 1853 and opened up new markets, but caused the decline of river traffic.

In 1856 the proprietor of the Langport Herald, James Richard Moreton, printed and published the 107 hymn tunes and six anthems written by his father, who was the minister of Langport Independent Chapel. This was the Reverend James Moreton's Sacred Music, used by Congregationalists and other denominations in the 19th century; there is a copy in the British Library.

In World War II Langport was the site of a United States Army military prison or Disciplinary Training Center.

== Governance ==
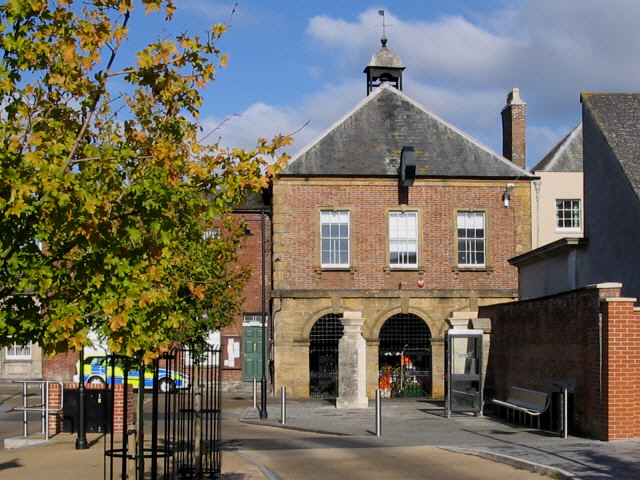
Langport Town Hall

The parish council has responsibility for local issues, including setting an annual precept (local rate) to cover the council's operating costs and producing annual accounts for public scrutiny. The parish council evaluates local planning applications and works with the local police, district council officers, and neighbourhood watch groups on matters of crime, security, and traffic. The parish council's role also includes initiating projects for the maintenance and repair of parish facilities, as well as consulting with the district council on the maintenance, repair, and improvement of highways, drainage, footpaths, public transport, and street cleaning. Conservation matters (including trees and listed buildings) and environmental issues are also the responsibility of the council. The parish council, known as Langport Town Council, is based at Langport Town Hall.

For local government purposes, since 1 April 2023, the town comes under the unitary authority of Somerset Council. Prior to this, it was part of the non-metropolitan district of South Somerset, which was formed on 1 April 1974 under the Local Government Act 1972, having previously been part of Langport Rural District.

The town is in the 'Langport and Huish' electoral ward. Langport is the most populous area but the ward stretches south and east to Huish Episcopi. The total ward population at the 2011 census was 2,872.

It is also part of the Glastonbury and Somerton county constituency represented in the House of Commons of the Parliament of the United Kingdom. It elects one Member of Parliament (MP) by the first past the post system of election.

== Geography ==
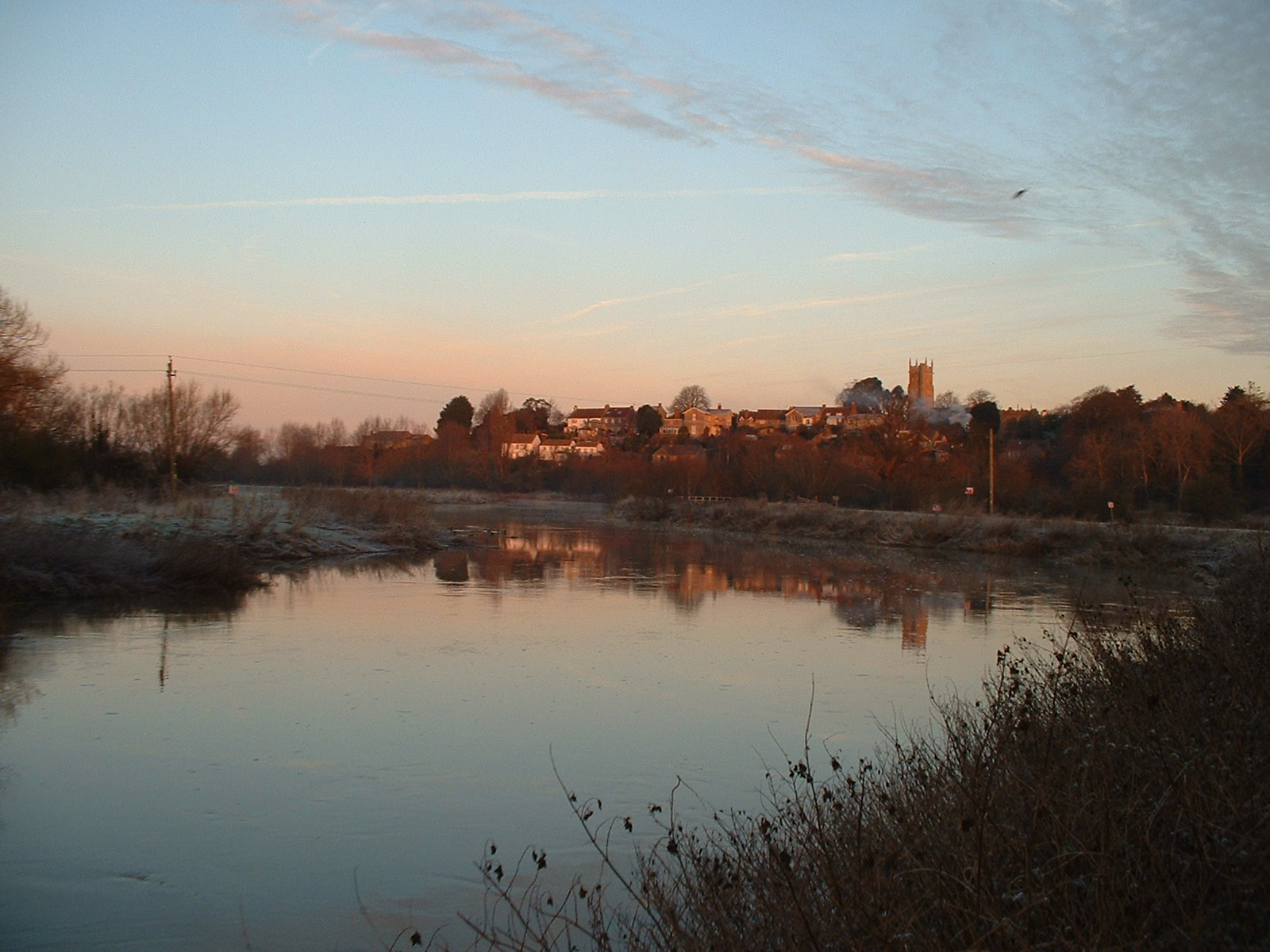
Langport viewed from the River Parrett

Langport lies on the east bank of the River Parrett, below the point where that river is joined by the River Yeo (Ivel). There is a causeway across the moor and an important bridge over the river. Below Langport the Parrett is tidal. The rivers flow from the southern hills through Thorney Moor and Kings Moor, through a gap between the upland areas around Somerton and Curry Rivel, onto the Somerset Levels through which it flows past Bridgwater to the Bristol Channel. During the winter the low-lying areas around Langport are sometimes flooded.

Langport Railway Cutting is a Geological Conservation Review site where Gravels are exposed which show scour-and-fill structures consistent with braided stream deposition from the Pleistocene age.

To the south of the town is Wet Moor, a biological Site of Special Scientific Interest which is part of the extensive grazing marsh grasslands and ditch systems of the Somerset Levels and Moors. In storm conditions the rivers can overtop their banks and overspill into the adjacent low-lying moorland. The rivers running through the moor make home for many wildlife, including wintering whooper swans.

=== Climate ===
Along with the rest of South West England, Langport has a temperate climate which is generally wetter and milder than the rest of the country. The annual mean temperature is approximately 10 °C (50.0 °F). Seasonal temperature variation is less extreme than most of the United Kingdom because of the adjacent sea temperatures. The summer months of July and August are the warmest, with a mean daily maximum of about 21 °C (69.8 °F). In winter the mean daily minimum temperature is about 1 °C (33.8 °F) or 2 °C (35.6 °F) are common. In the summer the Azores high pressure affects the southwest of England; however convective cloud sometimes forms inland, reducing the number of hours of sunshine.

Annual sunshine rates are slightly less than the regional average of 1,600 hours. In December 1998 there were 20 days without sun recorded at Yeovilton. Most of the rainfall in the southwest is caused by Atlantic depressions or by convection. Most of the rainfall in autumn and winter is caused by the Atlantic depressions, which is when they are most active. In summer, a large proportion of the rainfall is caused by sun heating the ground, leading to convection and to showers and thunderstorms. Average rainfall is around 700 mm (28 in). About 8–15 days of snowfall is typical. November to March have the highest mean wind speeds, and June to August have the lightest winds. The predominant wind direction is from the southwest.

== Landmarks ==
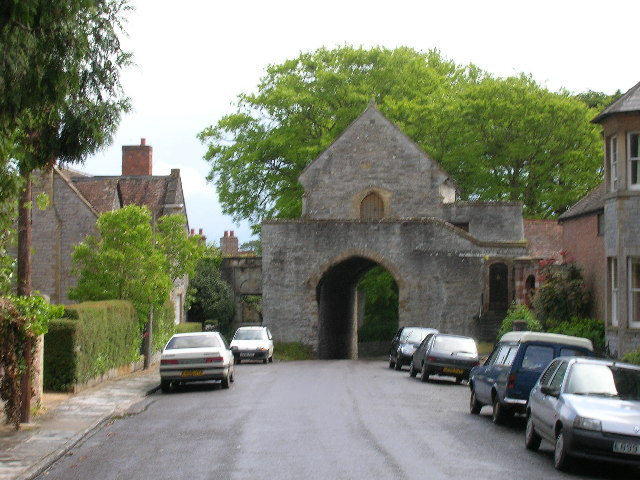
The Hanging Chapel, hanging above a medieval archway

Two buildings in the town, the Tudor House and The Warehouse in Great Bow Yard, have been restored by the Somerset Buildings Preservation Trust.

Close to All Saints' Church, an archway crosses the road, bearing a Perpendicular building known as The Hanging Chapel. After serving this purpose it housed first the grammar school (founded 1675), then the Quekett Museum, named after John Thomas Quekett (1815–61) the histologist, a native of the town, whose father was master of the school. The hanging chapel afterwards became a masonic hall.

== Education ==
Education for children aged 11 to 18 is provided by Huish Episcopi Academy, a mixed secondary school with academy status. The school has a specialist status as a Science College and Language College. It has around 1,400 students.

Huish Episcopi Primary School — near the centre of Langport — takes pupils from the age of 4 to 11. The school serves Langport, Huish Episcopi, Aller, Muchelney, Pibsbury, Drayton and Pitney. The school site includes 7 classrooms, an ICT suite, hall, library, playground and school field. There are around 180 pupils.

St Gildas' School formerly provided private education, but is now closed.

== Religious sites ==
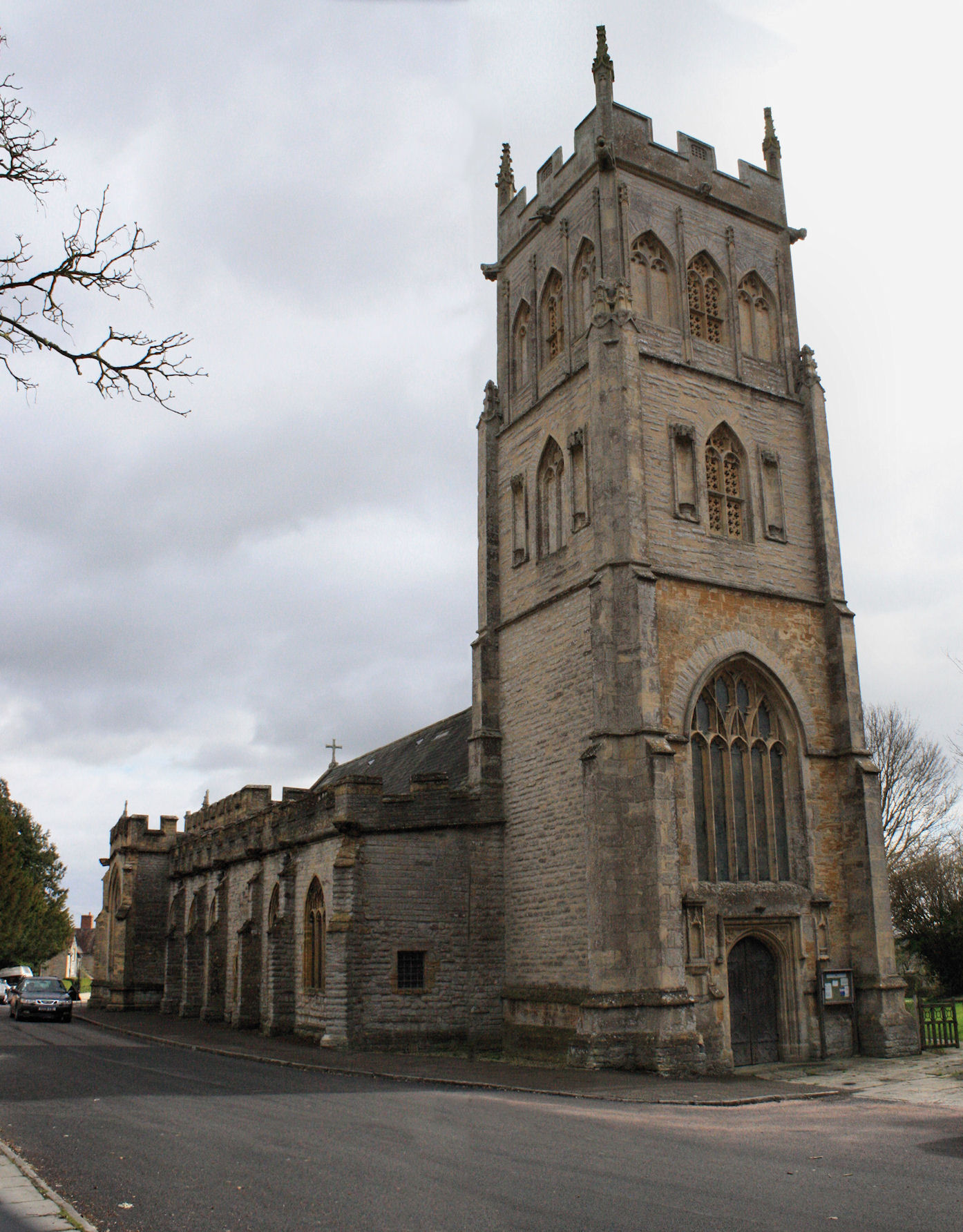
All Saints' church

The main street leads up a slope from the river to the fine Perpendicular church of All Saints, which is a Grade I listed building. The square tower (with its octagonal stair turret), which is in three stages, dates from the 15th century but the top section was rebuilt in 1833. It has a number of interesting gargoyles known locally as ‘hunky punks’. The East window of the chancel contains a set of late 15th century glass depicting various saints, appropriate to the dedication "All Saints". Although restored in the 19th century it is one of the best preserved medieval windows in Somerset. Additionally it is unusual in that the window contains a full set of glass from the same period. The church has only occasional services and is in the care of the Churches Conservation Trust, who have carried out extensive rebuilding work. The congregation of Langport and Huish Episcopi use St Mary's Church Huish Episcopi as the parish church of the community (Parish of Huish Episcopi cum Langport).

== Railways ==
The Langport and Castle Cary Railway passes through Langport. The town was served by Langport East, which was on the Reading to Taunton Line, although it closed to passengers in 1962.

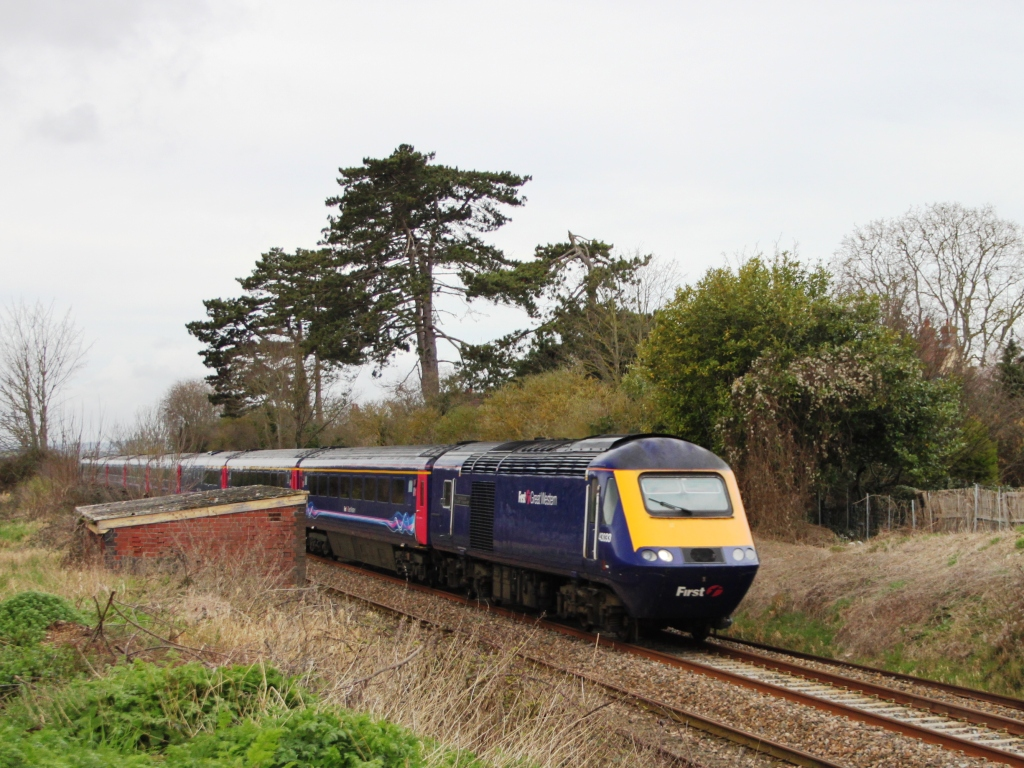
Langport East railway station site with a British Rail Class 43 (HST) heading east on the Reading to Taunton Line.

== Media ==
Langport is served by a free newspaper, The Leveller, established in 2010, which provides news of the town and the county of Somerset with a circulation (net of returns) of over 12,000 copies.

Local news and television programmes are provided by BBC West and ITV West Country. Television signals are received from the Mendip TV transmitter.

Local radio stations are BBC Radio Somerset on 95.5 FM, Heart West on 97.1 FM, Greatest Hits Radio South West (formerly The Breeze) on 105.6 FM and West Somerset Radio, a community based station which broadcasts on 104.4 FM.

== Notable people ==
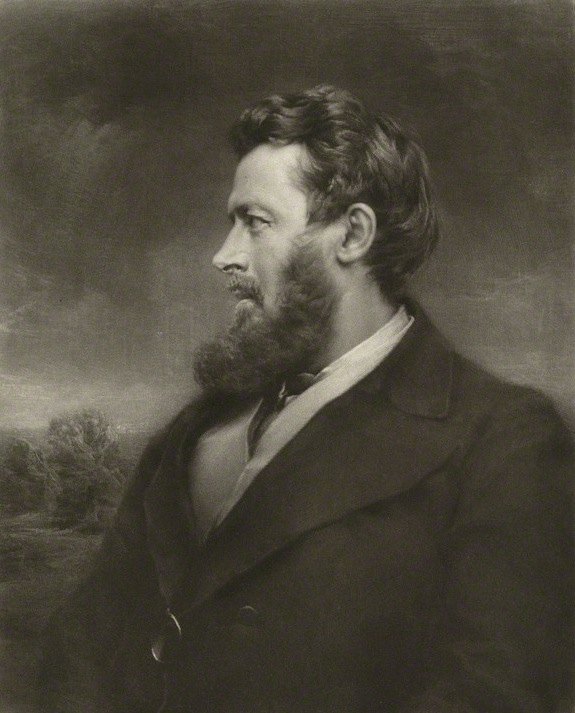
Walter Bagehot

- William Quekett (1802–1888), rector of Warrington, the eldest brother of John Thomas Quekett.
- John Thomas Quekett (1815–1861), microscopist and histologist.
- Anne Beale (1816–1900), novelist, poet and short story writer.
- Walter Bagehot (1826–1877), journalist, businessman, essayist and author.
- Emma Overd (1838–1928), folk singer, born and died in Langport.
- Norman Gash (1912–2009), historian, retired to Langport.
- Jacquemine Charrott Lodwidge (1919–2012), an art director, grew up in Langport.
- Marti Webb (born 1943), singer and actress, retired to Langport.
- Graham Watson (born 1956), former President of the Alliance of Liberals and Democrats for Europe Party, lived in Langport during most of his political career, from 1994 to 2017.
