= William Dallinger =

English Methodist minister and biologist

Dallinger by Edgar Herbert Thomas

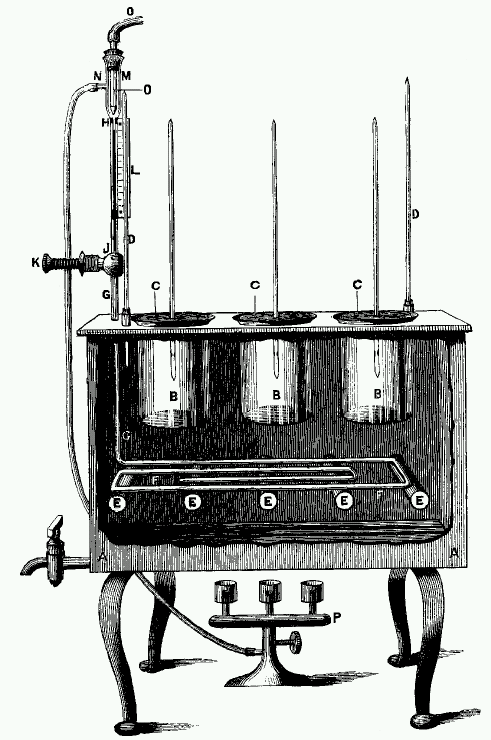
An incubator, from the William Dallinger publication The President's Address.

William Henry Dallinger FRS (5 July 1839 – 7 November 1909) was a British minister in the Wesleyan Methodist Church. He was also an accomplished scientist, being the first to study the complete lifecycle of unicellular organisms under the microscope and studying the adaptation of such organisms to temperature.

He made numerous contributions to microscopy, and was president of the Quekett Microscopical Club from 1889 to 1892. Dallinger was awarded three honorary doctorates, the Ll.D. from Victoria College, Toronto in 1884, the D.Sc. from Dublin in 1892, and the D.L.C. from Durham in 1896.

Dallinger was married to Emma Ion Goldsmith (1842-1910). They had one child, son Percy Gough (1867-1930).

== Research into Darwin's theories ==
Dallinger was one of the first to carry out a controlled evolution experiment. In the late 19th century, he cultivated small unicellular organisms in a custom-built incubator over a time period of seven years (1880–1886). Dallinger slowly increased the temperature of the incubator from an initial 60 °F up to 158 °F. The early cultures had shown clear signs of distress at a temperature of 73 °F, and were certainly not capable of surviving at 158 °F. The organisms Dallinger had in his incubator at the end of the experiment, on the other hand, were perfectly fine at 158 °F. However, these organisms would no longer grow at the initial 60 °F. Dallinger concluded that he had found evidence for Darwinian adaptation in his incubator, and that the organisms had adapted to live in a high-temperature environment. Unfortunately, Dallinger's incubator was accidentally destroyed in 1886, and Dallinger could not continue this line of research.

Dallinger was an early supporter of Darwinism. He accepted natural selection and considered creationism to be "absolutely untenable". He believed there was no conflict between religion and science and there was no reason to try and reconcile the Book of Genesis with geology.

== Selected scientific publications by Dallinger ==
- Dallinger W (1872). "Should the naturalist recognize a fourth kingdom in nature?". Proceedings of the Literary and Philosophical Society of Liverpool. 26: 286.
- Dallinger W., Drysdale J. (1873). "Researches on the life history of a Cercomonade: a lesson in biogenesis". Monthly Microscopical Journal. 10 (2): 53–58. doi:10.1111/j.1365-2818.1873.tb04643.x.
- Dallinger W (1878). "On the life-history of a minute septic organism: with an account of experiments made to determine its thermal death point". Proceedings of the Royal Society of London. 27 (185–189): 332–350. doi:10.1098/rspl.1878.0055.
- Dallinger, W. H. (1888). "The President's Address". Journal of the Royal Microscopical Society. 8 (2): 177–185. doi:10.1111/j.1365-2818.1888.tb01685.x.
- The Creator, and what we may know of the method of creation (1887)
