= The International Journal of Biochemistry & Cell Biology =

- Discipline: Biochemistry & Cell biology
- Language: English
- Edited by: Geoffrey Laurent

Publication details
- Former name(s): International Journal of Biochemistry
- History: 1970-present
- Publisher: Elsevier
- Frequency: Monthly
- Impact factor: 5.652 (2021)

Standard abbreviations
- ISO 4: Int. J. Biochem. Cell Biol.

Indexing
- CODEN: IJBBFU
- ISSN: 1357-2725
- LCCN: 95648313
- OCLC no.: 39284324
- International Journal of Biochemistry
- ISSN: 0020-711X

Links
- Journal homepage; Online archive

The International Journal of Biochemistry & Cell Biology is a monthly peer-reviewed scientific journal published by Elsevier, covering research in all areas of biochemistry and cell biology. The editor-in-chief is Geoffrey J. Laurent (University of Western Australia). The journal was established in 1970 as International Journal of Biochemistry and obtained its current title in 1995.

== Abstracting and indexing ==
The journal is abstracted and indexed in:

- BIOSIS
- Elsevier BIOBASE
- Chemical Abstracts
- Current Contents/BIOMED Database
- Current Contents/Life Sciences
- Current Contents/SciSearch Database
- Current Contents/Science Citation Index
- MEDLINE
- Embase
- Scopus
- EMBiology
- Science Citation Index

According to the Journal Citation Reports, the journal has a 2013 impact factor of 4.240.
