= Journal of Microscopy =

- Discipline: Microscopy
- Language: English
- Edited by: Michelle Peckham

Publication details
- Former names: Transactions of the Microscopical Society & Journal
- History: 1841-present
- Publisher: Wiley on behalf of the Royal Microscopical Society (United Kingdom)
- Frequency: Monthly
- Impact factor: 1.9 (2025)

Standard abbreviations
- ISO 4: J. Microsc.

Indexing
- CODEN: JMICAR
- ISSN: 0022-2720 (print); 1365-2818 (web)
- LCCN: 75613422
- OCLC no.: 746955555

Links
- Journal homepage; Online access; Online archive

The Journal of Microscopy is the monthly peer-reviewed scientific journal of the Royal Microscopical Society which covers all aspects of microscopy including spatially resolved spectroscopy, compositional mapping, and image analysis. This includes technology and applications in physics, chemistry, material science, and the life sciences. It is published by Wiley-Blackwell on behalf of the Society. The editor-in-chief is Michelle Peckham, a Cell Biology professor at University of Leeds.
The journal publishes review articles, original research papers, short communications, and letters to the editor. It was established in 1841 as the Transactions of the Microscopical Society of London, obtaining its current name in 1869, with volume numbering restarting at 1.

== Abstracting and indexing ==
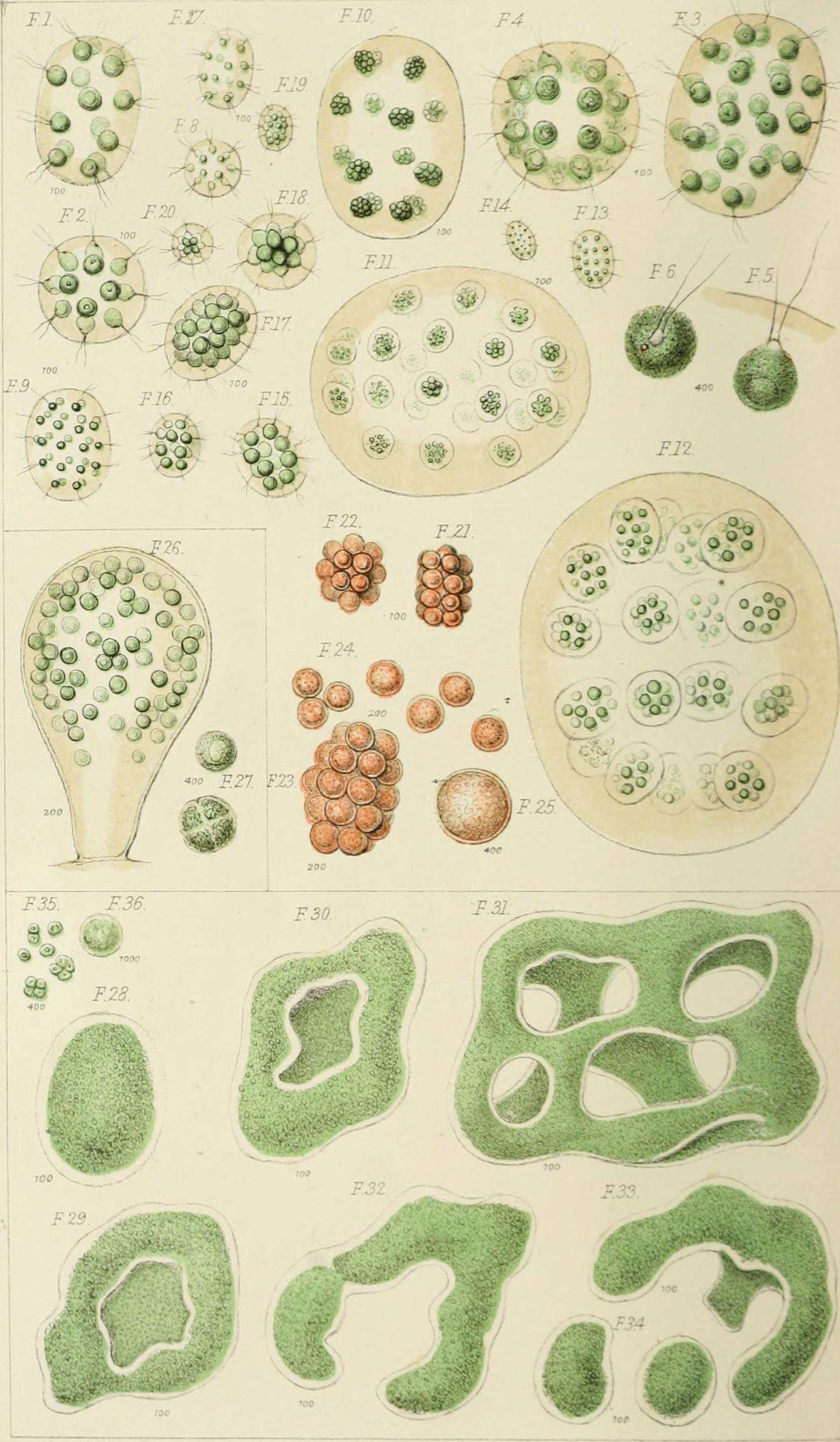
A plate from the 1853 volume illustrating Arthur Henfrey's paper on Fresh-water Con-fervoid Algae.

The journals is abstracted and indexed in:

- Academic Search Premier
- Biological Abstracts
- BIOSIS Previews
- CAB Abstracts
- CAB Direct
- Chemical Abstracts Service
- Current Contents/Life Sciences
- Current Index to Statistics
- Embase
- Global Health
- Mathematical Reviews
- MEDLINE/PubMed
- Science Citation Index
- VINITI Database RAS

According to the Journal Citation Reports, the journal has a 2025 impact factor of 1.9.
