= John Thomas Quekett =

English microscopist and histologist

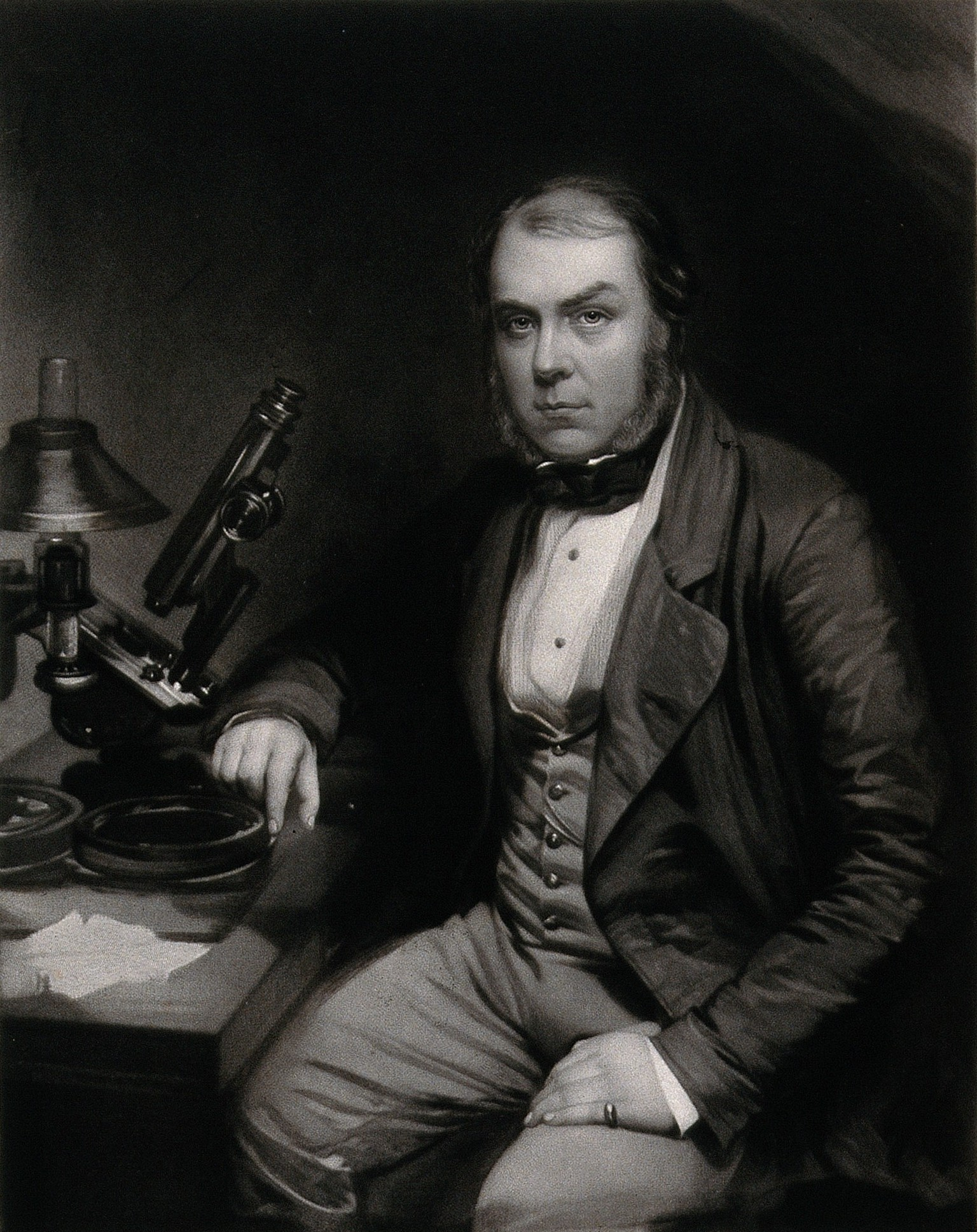
John Thomas Quekett

John Thomas Quekett (11 August 1815 – 20 August 1861) was an English microscopist and histologist.

Quekett studied medicine at the London Hospital in 1831. He became a licentiate of the Apothecaries' Company and a member of the Royal College of Surgeons.

In 1839, along with his brother Edwin John Quekett) co-founded the Royal Microscopical Society. Quekett served as the society's secretary from 1841 to 1860. In 1843 he was appointed assistant conservator of the Hunterian Museum, London, and in 1856 conservator of the museum and professor of histology on the retirement of professor Richard Owen.

He is the namesake of the Quekett Microscopical Club, established in 1865.

== Biography ==
Quekett, born at Langport, Somerset, on 11 August 1815, was the youngest son of William Quekett and Mary, daughter of John Bartlett. The father was at Cockermouth grammar school with William and Christopher Wordsworth, and from 1790 till his death in 1842 was master of Langport grammar school. He educated his sons at home, and each of them was encouraged to collect specimens in some branch of natural history. The eldest brother, William Quekett, was a rector and author.

When only sixteen John gave a course of lectures on microscopic subjects, illustrated by original diagrams and by a microscope which he had himself made out of a roasting-jack, a parasol, and a few pieces of brass purchased at a neighbouring marine-store shop. On leaving school he was apprenticed, first to a surgeon in Langport, and afterwards to his brother Edwin John Quekett, entering King's College, London, and the London Hospital medical school. In 1840 he qualified at Apothecaries' Hall, and at the Royal College of Surgeons won the three-years studentship in human and comparative anatomy, then first instituted.

He formed a most extensive and valuable collection of microscopic preparations, injected by himself, illustrating the tissues of plants and animals in health and in disease, and showing the results and uses of microscopic investigation. In November 1843 he was appointed by the College of Surgeons assistant conservator of the Hunterian Museum in London, under Professor (afterwards Sir) Richard Owen, and in 1844 he was appointed demonstrator of minute anatomy. In 1846 his collection of two thousand five hundred preparations was purchased by the college, and he was directed to prepare a descriptive illustrated catalogue of the whole histological collection belonging to the college, of which they constituted the chief part. In 1852 the title of his demonstratorship was changed to that of professor of histology; and on Owen's obtaining permission to reside at Richmond, Quekett was appointed resident conservator, finally succeeding Owen as conservator in 1856. His health, however, soon failed, and he died at Pangbourne, Berkshire, whither he had gone for the benefit of his health, on 20 Aug. 1861.

In 1841 Quekett succeeded Arthur Farre as secretary of the Microscopical Society, a post which he retained until 1860, when he was elected president, but was unable to attend any meetings during his year of office. He was elected a fellow of the Linnean Society in 1857, and of the Royal Society in 1860.

In 1846 Quekett married Isabella Mary Anne (d. 1872), daughter of Robert Scott, Bengal Civil Service, by whom he had four children, including the conchologist John Frederick Whitlie Quekett. There is a lithographic portrait of Quekett in Maguire's Ipswich series of 1849, and a coloured one by W. Lens Aldous. Upon Quekett's death, Joseph Henry Green, Thomas Wormald, George Gulliver and several other members of the Council of the Royal College of Surgeons strongly supported the college's granting of a pension to the widow; Wormald and James Moncrieff Arnott each contributed £100 in addition to the pension.

== Works ==
Quekett's work as an histologist was remarkable for its originality and for its influence upon the anatomical studies of the medical profession in this country. His Practical Treatise on the Use of the Microscope (1848, 8vo) did much also to promote the study among medical men and amateurs, and among those who came to him for instruction was the prince consort. His work in this direction is commemorated by the Quekett Microscopical Club, which was established in 1865, under the presidency of Edwin Lankester.

Quekett's chief publications were:

- Practical Treatise on the Use of the Microscope, 1848, 8vo; 2nd edit. 1852; 3rd edit. 1855, which was also translated into German.
- Descriptive and Illustrated Catalogue of the Histological Series … in the Museum of the Royal College of Surgeons, vol. i. Elementary Tissues of Vegetables and Animals, 1850, 4to; vol. ii. Structure of the Skeleton of Vertebrate Animals, 1855.
- Lectures on Histology, vol. i. 1852; vol. ii. 1854, 8vo.
- (with John Morris) Catalogue of the Fossil Organic Remains of Plants in the Museum of the Royal College of Surgeons, 1859, 4to.
- Catalogue of Plants and Invertebrates … 1860, 4to.

Twenty-two papers by him are also enumerated in the Royal Society's Catalogue of Scientific Papers (v. 53–4), mostly contributed to the Microscopical Society's Transactions, and dealing with animal histology. One of the most important of these is that on the Intimate Structure of Bones in the four great Classes, Mammals, Birds, Reptiles, and Fishes, with Remarks on the Value of the Knowledge in determining minute Organic Remains, Microscopical Society's Transactions, vol. ii. 1846, pp. 46–58.
