= Electron crystallography =

Method to determine atomic positions in solids using an electron microscope

Electron crystallography is a subset of methods in electron diffraction focusing upon detailed determination of the positions of atoms in solids using a transmission electron microscope (TEM). It can involve the use of high-resolution transmission electron microscopy images, electron diffraction patterns including convergent-beam electron diffraction or combinations of these. It has been successful in determining some bulk structures, and also surface structures. Two related methods are low-energy electron diffraction which has solved the structure of many surfaces, and reflection high-energy electron diffraction which is used to monitor surfaces often during growth.

The technique dates back to soon after the discovery of electron diffraction in 1927-28, and was used in many early works. However, for many years quantitative electron crystallography was not used, instead the diffraction information was combined qualitatively with imaging results. A number of advances from the 1950s in particular laid the foundation for more quantitative work, ranging from accurate methods to perform forward calculations to methods to invert to maps of the atomic structure. With the improvement of the imaging capabilities of electron microscopes crystallographic data is now commonly obtained by combining images with electron diffraction information, or in some cases by collecting three dimensional electron diffraction data by a number of different approaches.

== History ==
The general approach dates back to the work in 1924 of Louis de Broglie in his PhD thesis Recherches sur la théorie des quanta where he introduced the concept of electrons as matter waves. The wave nature was experimentally confirmed for electron beams in the work of two groups, the first the Davisson–Germer experiment, the other by George Paget Thomson and Alexander Reid. Alexander Reid, who was Thomson's graduate student, performed the first experiments, but he died soon after in a motorcycle accident. These experiments were rapidly followed by the first non-relativistic diffraction model for electrons by Hans Bethe based upon the Schrödinger equation, which is very close to how electron diffraction is now described. Significantly, Clinton Davisson and Lester Germer noticed that their results could not be interpreted using a Bragg's law approach as the positions were systematically different; the approach of Hans Bethe which includes both multiple scattering and the refraction due to the average potential yielded more accurate results. Very quickly there were multiple advances, for instance Seishi Kikuchi's observations of lines that can be used for crystallographic indexing due to combined elastic and inelastic scattering, gas electron diffraction developed by Herman Mark and Raymond Weil, diffraction in liquids by Louis Maxwell, and the first electron microscopes developed by Max Knoll and Ernst Ruska.

Despite early successes such as the determination of the positions of hydrogen atoms in NH_{4}Cl crystals by W. E. Laschkarew and I. D. Usykin in 1933, boric acid by John M. Cowley in 1953 and orthoboric acid by William Houlder Zachariasen in 1954, electron diffraction for many years was a qualitative technique used to check samples within electron microscopes. John M Cowley explains in a 1968 paper:

Thus was founded the belief, amounting in some cases almost to an article of faith, and persisting even to the present day, that it is impossible to interpret the intensities of electron diffraction patterns to gain structural information.

This has slowly changed. One key step was the development in 1936 by Walther Kossel and Gottfried Möllenstedt of convergent beam electron diffraction (CBED), This approach was extended by Peter Goodman and Gunter Lehmpfuhl, then mainly by the groups of John Steeds and Michiyoshi Tanaka who showed how to use CBED patterns to determine point groups and space groups. This was combined with other transmission electron microscopy approaches, typically where both local microstructure and atomic structure was of importance.

A second key set of work was that by the group of Boris Vainshtein who demonstrated solving the structure of many different materials such as clays and micas using powder diffraction patterns, a success attributed to the samples being relatively thin. (Since the advent of precession electron diffraction it has become clear that averaging over many different electron beam directions and thicknesses significantly reduces dynamical diffraction effects, so was probably also important.)

More complete crystallographic analysis of intensity data was slow to develop. One of the key steps was the demonstration in 1976 by Douglas L. Dorset and Herbert A. Hauptman that conventional direct methods for x-ray crystallography could be used. Another was the demonstration in 1986 that a Patterson function could be powerful in the seminal solution of the silicon (111) 7x7 reconstructed surface by Kunio Takanayagi using ultra-high vacuum electron diffraction. More complete analyses were the demonstration that classical inversion methods could be used for surfaces in 1997 by Dorset and Laurence D. Marks, and in 1998 the work by Jon Gjønnes who combined three-dimensional electron diffraction with precession electron diffraction and direct methods to solve an intermetallic, also using dynamical refinements.

At the same time as approaches to invert diffraction data using electrons were established, the resolution of electron microscopes became good enough that images could be combined with diffraction information. At first resolution was poor, with in 1956 James Menter publishing the first electron microscope images showing the lattice structure of a material at 1.2nm resolution. In 1968 Aaron Klug and David DeRosier used electron microscopy to visualise the structure of the tail of bacteriophage T4, a common virus, a key step in the use of electrons for macromolecular structure determination. The first quantitative matching of atomic scale images and dynamical simulations was published in 1972 by J. G. Allpress, E. A. Hewat, A. F. Moodie and J. V. Sanders. In the early 1980s the resolution of electron microscopes was now sufficient to resolve the atomic structure of materials, for instance with the 600 kV instrument led by Vernon Cosslett, so combinations of high-resolution transmission electron microscopy and diffraction became standard across many areas of science. Most of the research published using these approaches is described as electron microscopy, without the addition of the term electron crystallography.

== Comparison with X-ray crystallography ==
It can complement X-ray crystallography for studies of very small crystals (<0.1 micrometers), both inorganic, organic, and proteins, such as membrane proteins, that cannot easily form the large 3-dimensional crystals required for that process. Protein structures are usually determined from either 2-dimensional crystals (sheets or helices), polyhedrons such as viral capsids, or dispersed individual proteins. Electrons can be used in these situations, whereas X-rays cannot, because electrons interact more strongly with atoms than X-rays do. Thus, X-rays will travel through a thin 2-dimensional crystal without diffracting significantly, whereas electrons can be used to form an image. Conversely, the strong interaction between electrons and protons makes thick (e.g. 3-dimensional > 1 micrometer) crystals impervious to electrons, which only penetrate short distances.

One of the main difficulties in X-ray crystallography is determining phases in the diffraction pattern. Because of the complexity of X-ray lenses, it is difficult to form an image of the crystal being diffracted, and hence phase information is lost. Fortunately, electron microscopes can resolve atomic structure in real space and the crystallographic structure factor phase information can be experimentally determined from an image's Fourier transform. The Fourier transform of an atomic resolution image is similar, but different, to a diffraction pattern—with reciprocal lattice spots reflecting the symmetry and spacing of a crystal. Aaron Klug was the first to realize that the phase information could be read out directly from the Fourier transform of an electron microscopy image that had been scanned into a computer, already in 1968. For this, and his studies on virus structures and transfer-RNA, Klug received the Nobel Prize for chemistry in 1982.

== Radiation damage ==
A common problem to X-ray crystallography and electron crystallography is radiation damage, by which especially organic molecules and proteins are damaged as they are being imaged, limiting the resolution that can be obtained. This is especially troublesome in the setting of electron crystallography, where that radiation damage is focused on far fewer atoms. One technique used to limit radiation damage is electron cryomicroscopy, in which the samples undergo cryofixation and imaging takes place at liquid nitrogen or even liquid helium temperatures. Because of this problem, X-ray crystallography has been much more successful in determining the structure of proteins that are especially vulnerable to radiation damage. Radiation damage was recently investigated using MicroED of thin 3D crystals in a frozen hydrated state.

== Protein structures determined by electron crystallography ==
The first electron crystallographic protein structure to achieve atomic resolution was bacteriorhodopsin, determined by Richard Henderson and coworkers at the Medical Research Council Laboratory of Molecular Biology in 1990. However, already in 1975 Unwin and Henderson had determined the first membrane protein structure at intermediate resolution (7 Ångström), showing for the first time the internal structure of a membrane protein, with its alpha-helices standing perpendicular to the plane of the membrane. Since then, several other high-resolution structures have been determined by electron crystallography, including the light-harvesting complex, the nicotinic acetylcholine receptor, and the bacterial flagellum. The highest resolution protein structure solved by electron crystallography of 2D crystals is that of the water channel aquaporin-0. In 2012, Jan Pieter Abrahams and coworkers extended electron crystallography to 3D protein nanocrystals by rotation electron diffraction (RED).

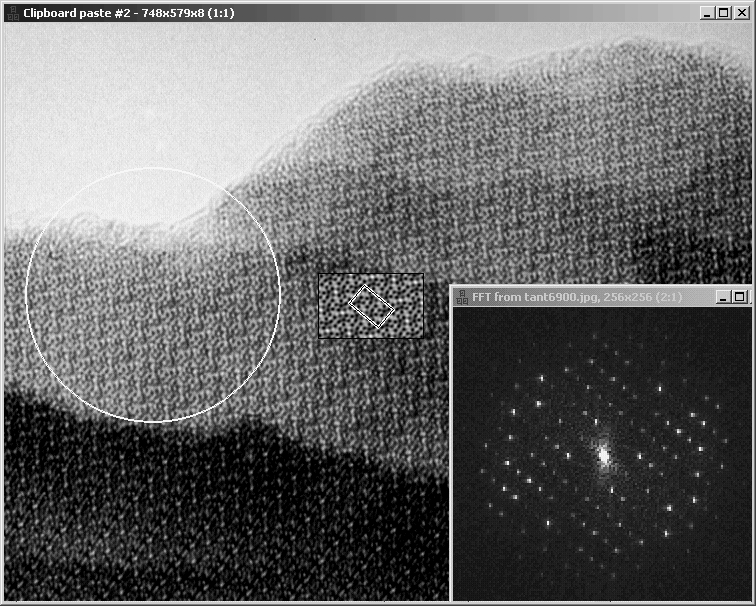
Electron microscopy image of an inorganic tantalum oxide, with its Fourier transform, inset. Notice how the appearance changes from the upper thin region to the thicker lower region. The unit cell of this compound is about 15 by 25 Ångström. It is outlined at the centre of the figure, inside the result from image processing, where the symmetry has been taken into account. The black dots show clearly all the tantalum atoms. The diffraction extends to 6 orders along the 15 Å direction and 10 orders in the perpendicular direction. Thus the resolution of the EM image is 2.5 Å (15/6 or 25/10). This calculated Fourier transform contain both amplitudes (as seen) and phases (not displayed).

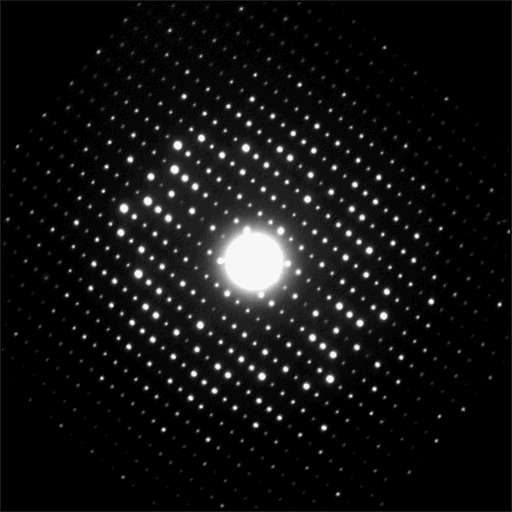
Electron diffraction pattern of the same crystal of inorganic tantalum oxide shown above. Notice that there are many more diffraction spots here than in the diffractogram calculated from the EM image above. The diffraction extends to 12 orders along the 15 Å direction and 20 orders in the perpendicular direction. Thus the resolution of the ED pattern is 1.25 Å (15/12 or 25/20). ED patterns do not contain phase information, but the clear differences between intensities of the diffraction spots can be used in crystal structure determination.

== Application to inorganic materials ==
Electron crystallographic studies on inorganic crystals using high-resolution electron microscopy (HREM) images were first performed by Aaron Klug in 1978 and by Sven Hovmöller and coworkers in 1984. HREM images were used because they allow to select (by computer software) only the very thin regions close to the edge of the crystal for structure analysis (see also crystallographic image processing). This is of crucial importance since in the thicker parts of the crystal the exit-wave function (which carries the information about the intensity and position of the projected atom columns) is no longer linearly related to the projected crystal structure. Moreover, not only do the HREM images change their appearance with increasing crystal thickness, they are also very sensitive to the chosen setting of the defocus Δf of the objective lens (see the HREM images of GaN for example). To cope with this complexity methods based upon the Cowley-Moodie multislice algorithm and non-linear imaging theory have been developed to simulate images; this only became possible once the FFT method was developed.

In addition to electron microscopy images, it is also possible to use electron diffraction (ED) patterns for crystal structure determination. The utmost care must be taken to record such ED patterns from the thinnest areas in order to keep most of the structure related intensity differences between the reflections (quasi-kinematical diffraction conditions). Just as with X-ray diffraction patterns, the important crystallographic structure factor phases are lost in electron diffraction patterns and must be uncovered by special crystallographic methods such as direct methods, maximum likelihood or (more recently) by the charge-flipping method. On the other hand, ED patterns of inorganic crystals have often a high resolution (= interplanar spacings with high Miller indices) much below 1 Ångström. This is comparable to the point resolution of the best electron microscopes. Under favourable conditions it is possible to use ED patterns from a single orientation to determine the complete crystal structure. Alternatively a hybrid approach can be used which uses HRTEM images for solving and intensities from ED for refining the crystal structure.

Recent progress for structure analysis by ED was made by introducing the Vincent-Midgley precession technique for recording electron diffraction patterns. The thereby obtained intensities are usually much closer to the kinematical intensities, so that even structures can be determined that are out of range when processing conventional (selected area) electron diffraction data.

Crystal structures determined via electron crystallography can be checked for their quality by using first-principles calculations within density functional theory (DFT). This approach has been used to assist in solving surface structures and for the validation of several metal-rich structures which were only accessible by HRTEM and ED, respectively.

Recently, two very complicated zeolite structures have been determined by electron crystallography combined with X-ray powder diffraction. These are more complex than the most complex zeolite structures determined by X-ray crystallography.
