= Angus Kirkland =

British microscopist (born 1965)

Professor Angus Kirkland FInstP FRSC FRMS HonFRMS
- Born: Angus Ian Kirkland; August 1965 (age 61)
- Education: University of Cambridge (MA, Ph.D)
- Known for: Exit-wave restoration
- Scientific career
- Fields: Electron microscopy HRTEM; STEM
- Workplaces: University of Oxford; Rosalind Franklin Institute; Diamond Light Source; University of Cambridge
- Thesis: High resolution electron microscopic studies of colloidal metal particles. (1989)
- Doctoral advisor: Professor P P Edwards FRS
- Notable students: Sarah Haigh

Angus Ian Kirkland FInstP FRSC FRMS HonFRMS (born August 1965) is the JEOL Professor of Electron Microscopy at the Department of Materials, University of Oxford. Professor Kirkland specialises in High-resolution transmission electron microscopy and Scanning transmission electron microscopy.

== Early life and education ==
Kirkland completed a Master of Arts in Natural Sciences, and a Doctor of Philosophy at the University of Cambridge in 1989.

== Career ==
Kirkland continued at Cavendish Laboratory as post-doctoral fellow until he became Senior Research Associate. He was later elected the Ramsay Memorial Trust Research Fellow.

He then moved to the Department of Materials, University of Oxford where he has led Oxford Electron Image Analysis Group since 2003. He was appointed as professor in 2005, and became the JEOL Professor of Electron Microscopy in 2011. He was the co-director of the University of Oxford’s David Cockayne Centre.

Kirkland research focuses on developing new quantitative techniques for ultra high-resolution electron microscopy, and new imaging detectors. His research also include developing analysis and simulation. He researches nanomaterials inorganic oxides structure and surfaces. The development of new detectors, e.g., Transmission Electron Aberration-Corrected Microscope. Angus Kirkland has an illustrious career with publications in Nature and Science. He led collaborations and grants valued at over £100M.

As of November 2022, he is the Science Director at the Rosalind Franklin Institute and the electron Physical Science Imaging Centre (ePSIC) at Diamond Light Source. He is also the Editor-in-Chief of Ultramicroscopy.

== Awards and honours ==
Kirkland is a Fellow of the Institute of Physics (FInstP), the Royal Society of Chemistry (FRSC), and the Royal Microscopical Society (FRMS).. In 2025 he was elected to an honorary Fellowship of the Royal Microscopical Society (HonFRMS).

Kirkland was awarded the Microscopy Society of America Award for the best paper published (2005). In 2015, he was awarded the Harald Rose Distinguished Lecture Prize and in 2016 the Quadrennial Prize of the European Microscopy Society. He also received the RMS Alan Agar Medal in 2017.

In 2012, Kirkland was appointed as an Honorary Professor at the centre of HRTEM, Nelson Mandela University, South Africa.

Kirkland was awarded an honorary Fellowship by the Royal Microscopical Society in 2025.

Kirkland was granted the Freedom of the City of London and elected a Freeman of the Worshipful Company of Scientific Instrument Makers in 2026.

== Selected publications ==
- Huilong Fei, Juncai Dong, Yexin Feng, Christopher S. Allen, Chengzhang Wan, Boris Volosskiy, Mufan Li, Zipeng Zhao, Yiliu Wang, Hongtao Sun, Pengfei An, Wenxing Chen, Zhiying Guo, Chain Lee, Dongliang Chen, Imran Shakir, Mingjie Liu, Tiandou Hu, Yadong Li, Angus I. Kirkland, Xiangfeng Duan, Yu Huang (2018-01). General synthesis and definitive structural identification of MN4C4 single-atom catalysts with tunable electrocatalytic activities. Nature Catalysis. 1 (1): 63–72. doi:10.1038/s41929-017-0008-y. ISSN 2520-1158.
- Alex W. Robertson, Christopher S. Allen, Yimin A. Wu, Kuang He, Jaco Olivier, Jan Neethling, Angus I. Kirkland, Jamie H. Warner (2012-10-23). Spatial control of defect creation in graphene at the nanoscale. Nature Communications. 3 (1): 1144. doi:10.1038/ncomms2141. ISSN 2041-1723.
- Lele Peng, Ziyang Wei, Chengzhang Wan, Jing Li, Zhuo Chen, Dan Zhu, Daniel Baumann, Haotian Liu, Christopher S. Allen, Xiang Xu, Angus I. Kirkland, Imran Shakir, Zeyad Almutairi, Sarah Tolbert, Bruce Dunn, Yu Huang, Philippe Sautet, Xiangfeng Duan (2020-09). A fundamental look at electrocatalytic sulfur reduction reaction. Nature Catalysis. 3 (9): 762–770. doi:10.1038/s41929-020-0498-x. ISSN 2520-1158.
- Meyer, Rüdiger R.; Sloan, Jeremy; Dunin-Borkowski, Rafal E.; Kirkland, Angus I.; Novotny, Miles C.; Bailey, Sam R.; Hutchison, John L.; Green, Malcolm L. H. (2000-08-25). Discrete Atom Imaging of One-Dimensional Crystals Formed Within Single-Walled Carbon Nanotubes. Science. 289 (5483): 1324–1326. doi:10.1126/science.289.5483.1324. ISSN 0036-8075.
- Warner, Jamie H.; Margine, Elena Roxana; Mukai, Masaki; Robertson, Alexander W.; Giustino, Feliciano; Kirkland, Angus I. (2012-07-13). Dislocation-Driven Deformations in Graphene. Science. 337 (6091): 209–212. doi:10.1126/science.1217529. ISSN 0036-8075.
