= International Centre for Advanced Materials =

The International Centre for Advanced Materials (ICAM) is a research partnership made up of the energy company BP and four universities: the University of Manchester, the University of Cambridge, the University of Illinois at Urbana–Champaign, and the Imperial College London. The ICAM is an experimental organisation, both in its research and partnership model, with the University of Manchester acting as the administrative hub, and the other universities acting as the spokes. The research undertaken is focused on improving the processes integral to the energy industry, in particular how advanced materials can be used to solve the challenges faced. Some notable research includes work on 3D simulation of viscoplastic fluids and fouling mitigation strategies for synthesised foulants.

== Structure ==
The organisation was founded in Autumn 2012 with a $100 million, 10 year investment from BP, which was then extended by 5 years to 2027. ICAM research is supporting BP's ambitions to become a net zero company by 2050. The research areas are divided into three themes: Low Carbon Energy, Sustainable Operations, and Underpinning Sciences. Low Carbon Energy, the largest of the three themes, includes subthemes Hydrogen, Electrification, Carbon Capture Utilisation and Storage, and Circular Economy and Sustainability.

== Governance board members ==
- Professor Sarah Haigh (BP-ICAM Director, UoM)
- Dr Mandar Thakare (BP-ICAM Associate Director, BP)
- Dr Kirsty Salmon (BP)
- Tim Bieri (BP)
- Dr Jon Salkeld (BP)
- Dr Richard Pearson (BP)
- Professor Martin Schröder (UoM)
- Professor Mary Ryan (IC)
- Professor James Elliot (UoC)
- Professor Paul Braun (UIUC)

== Programme management board members ==
- Professor Sarah Haigh (BP-ICAM Director, UoM)
- Dr Mandar Thakare (BP-ICAM Associate Director, BP)
- Dr Eric Doskocil (BP)
- Dr Matthew Turnbull (BP)
- Dr Lee Smith (BP)
- Dr Kevin West (BP)
- Dr Tincuta Veriotti (BP)
- Dr Adam Hajjar (BP)
- Professor David Lewis (UoM)
- Professor Camille Petit (IC)
- Professor Jonathan Nitschke (UoC)
- Professor Nancy Sottos (UIUC)
