= Allan Matthews =

English materials engineer

Allan Matthews FREng FRS FIMMM FIMechE FIET
- Born: Wigan, England

Academic background
- Education: The University of Salford (PhD)

Academic work
- Discipline: Engineering and Materials
- Sub-discipline: Tribology
- Institutions: University of Manchester
- Website: http://www.icam-online.org/about-us/governance/allan-matthews/

Allan Matthews (1952) is professor of surface engineering and tribology at the University of Manchester and director of the Digitalised Surfaces Manufacturing Network.

== Education ==
Matthews attended Upholland Grammar School and completed his PhD at Salford University studying environmentally-friendly plasma-based processes, especially their use for coating industrial tools.

== Career ==
Matthews spent his early career in the UK aerospace industry, first with Hawker Siddeley Dynamics and then British Aerospace Dynamics Group.

He is known as an early pioneer of the discipline of surface engineering, having founded a laboratory to research that subject at Hull University in 1982, where he established and directed the Research Centre in Surface Engineering. He and his research group led significant breakthroughs in plasma-assisted processes for surface treatment and coatings, in particular in thermionically enhanced plasma processes for nitrogen and carbon-diffusion treatments of steels and titanium alloys, as well as oxide and nitride coatings to act as wear and heat-resisting barriers on cutting tools and aero-engine parts.

In 2002, he was invited to join the department of engineering materials at the University of Sheffield. There he continued research in plasma-based surface engineering and helped establish (and was executive director of) the Leonardo Centre for Tribology and Surface Technology, which was made possible through a benefaction by Dr. Peter Jost. In 2007 Matthews became head of department of materials science and engineering at the University of Sheffield.

In 2016, Matthews joined the academic staff in the School of Materials Science and Engineering at The University of Manchester. Later that year Matthews was appointed Director of the International Centre for Advanced Materials (bp-ICAM)], which is a $100 million collaboration between BP, The University of Manchester, Imperial College London, the University of Illinois at Urbana-Champaign and the University of Cambridge. In his tenure as Director, Matthews worked closely with the bp-ICAM Executive Director, Vernon Gibson CB FRS.

During his time at The University of Manchester, Matthews has been an ambassador for Advanced Materials, facilitating networking between academia and industry, with a focus on the Tribology sub-theme.

Matthews has co-authored many peer-reviewed publications; most notably, Coatings Tribology: Properties, Mechanisms, Techniques and Applications in Surface Engineering, with Kenneth Holmberg.

== Awards and honours ==
He has held positions with many Learned and Professional societies, including the British Vacuum Council, the Society of Vacuum Coaters, the AVS Advanced Surface Engineering Division (AVS-ASED) and the Surface Engineering Divisional Board of the IoM3.

Matthews was elected a Fellow of the Royal Academy of Engineering (FREng) in 2012. He was elected as a Fellow of the Royal Society in 2023. In 2011, Matthews was awarded The Institute of Materials, Minerals and Mining (IOM3) Gold Medal for his "significant contribution to the industrial application of materials". In 2018, Matthews was awarded the IOM3 Tom Bell Surface Engineering Medal in recognition of his work in the field, as well as the AVS-ASED R. F. Bunshah Award and Honorary ICMCTF lectureship for "pioneering contributions to the science of surface engineering". He was also the recipient of the Donald Julius Groen Prize in 2005, and the IMechE Bronze Tribology Award in 1981

In 1987, Matthews became an Editor of the Elsevier Surface and Coatings Technology journal, becoming editor-in-chief in 2013.

His research has been funded by the Engineering and Physical Sciences Research Council (EPSRC), the European Union (EU), European Research Council (ERC) and other governmental and industrial sources.
