= ENSCM =

The acronym ENSCM may refer to:

- École nationale supérieure de chimie de Montpellier
- École nationale supérieure de chronométrie et de mécanique
