= Kenneth Holmberg =

Finnish engineer

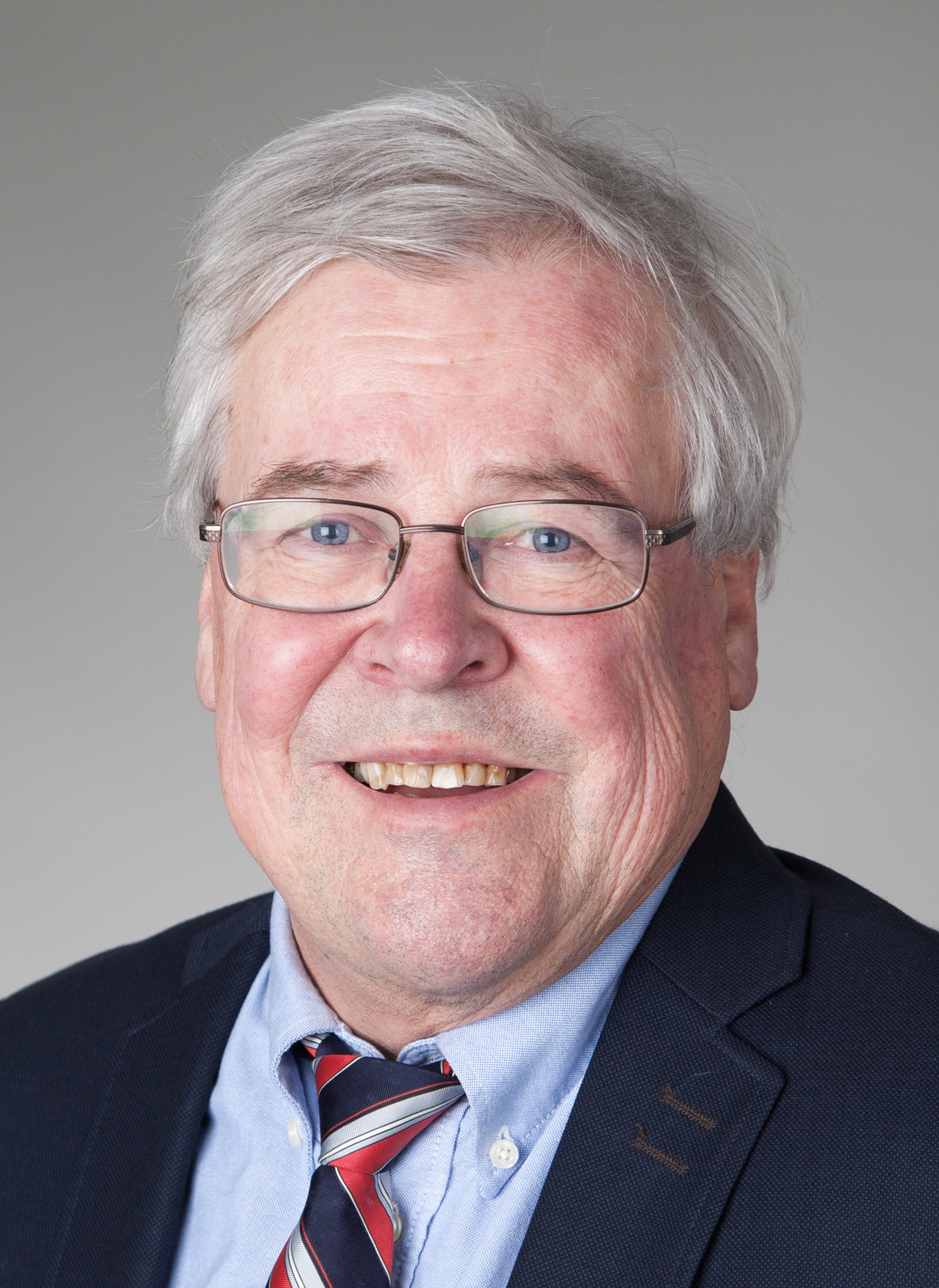
- Kenneth Holmberg (2017)
- Born: 26 May 1949 (age 76); Helsinki
- Education: Helsinki University of Technology
- Known for: Internationally recognised and awarded tribology expert
- Children: 3
- Awards: Tribology Gold Medal
- Scientific career
- Fields: Mechanical Engineering
- Institutions: Technical Research Centre of Finland
- Thesis: Elstohydrodynamic and boundary lubrication theories (1984)

Kenneth Gösta Holmberg (born 26 May 1949, Helsinki) is a Finnish professor emeritus in Mechanical Engineering, especially Tribology,

Holmberg has studied the friction and wear of coated surfaces, computer simulation of tribological contacts, E-maintenance and global impact of friction and wear on energy consumption, emissions and economy. He has provided several scientific books and is an internationally recognised and awarded tribology expert.

== Early life and education ==
Kenneth Holmberg was born in Helsinki, Finland, on 26 May 1949, and belongs to the Swedish-speaking minority of Finland. He received his MS in mechanical engineering 1976, Licentiate of Technology 1980 and PhD Tech 1984 at Helsinki University of Technology. His licentiate and doctoral thesis were on elstohydrodynamic and boundary lubrication theories. He was the chairman of the Swedish-speaking student’s society TF Teknologföreningen 1972.

== Career ==
Holmberg made his research career in tribology and material science at VTT Technical Research Centre of Finland from 1980 as researcher. From 1993 he was as research professor at VTT in tribology, condition monitoring and operational reliability.

Holmberg is the author and editor of several books. He has published more than 200 scientific papers mainly in areas of tribology, surface engineering, lubrication, computational material modelling and simulation, operational reliability, maintenance and machine diagnostics.

In 1994, Holmberg and Allan Matthews from Hull University, UK wrote the book Coatings Tribology . They describe in the book the fundamental tribological mechanisms of loaded sliding surfaces covered by thin coatings, such as used today in automotive and electronics. In 2010, Holmberg wrote a book on E-maintenance, and he has developed computational modelling and simulation technology for tribological contacts. In a paper published 2013, Holmberg provided calculations on the impact of friction in passenger cars on energy consumption, emissions and economy from microcontact scale up to global scale.

Holmberg is Vice President of International Tribology Council and was President of the OECD IRG Wear Group 1992-2006 and President of COST 516 & 532 Tribology programs 1994-2007 including 25 European countries. He has been responsible for organizing major international conferences in tribology, condition monitoring and diagnostics, EUROTRIB’89, COMADEM’97 and NORDTRIB’00 . He has been board member in several scientific foundations and is a frequently used expert in the European Community and the European Science Foundation.

He has been Acting Professor and Docent at Aalto University, Visiting Professor at Ecole Centrale de Lyon, Lyon University, France and Visiting Professor at Sheffield University, UK. He was Scientific Secretary 1986-1997, Board Member 1994-2001 and Vice President 1997-2001 at the Swedish Academy of Engineering Sciences in Finland.

He served as Chief Engineering Counsellor at the Supreme Administrative Court in Finland 2003-2017 . He is an Executive Committee member of the International Tribology Council.

== Personal life ==
He was married with Ulla Andrea Holmberg (born Gyllenberg) and they have three children, Ville, Maya and Hanna and eight grandchildren.

== Awards ==
- 1990 the Euromaintenance Award
- 2001 the Gold Medal of the Swedish Academy of Engineering Sciences in Finland
- 2012 the VTT Award
- 2017 the Tribology Gold Medal from the Institution of Mechanical Engineers for his outstanding contribution in Tribology

== Publications ==
- Holmberg, Kenneth (1980). Elastohydrodynamic Lubrication Theory and Its Applications on Machine Elements. Espoo: Teknillinen korkeakoulu. ISBN 951-752-100-6.
- Holmberg, Kenneth (1984). Friction in low speed lubricated rolling and sliding contacts. Espoo: VTT Technical Research Centre of Finland. ISBN 951-38-2014-9.
- Holmberg, Kenneth; Matthews, Allan (2009). Coatings Tribology: Properties, Mechanisms, Techniques and Applications in Surface Engineering. Amsterdam: Elsevier. ISBN 978-0-444-52750-9.
- Holmberg, Kenneth et al. (2010) "E-maintenance", Springer, Heidelberg, ISBN 978-1-84996-204-9
- Holmberg, Kenneth; Andersson, Peter; and Erdemir, Ali (2012). "Global energy consumption due to friction in passenger cars," Tribology International, 47, pp. 221–234
- Holmberg, Kenneth; Laukkanen, Anssi; Turunen, Erja; and Laitinen, Tarja (2014). "Wear resistance optimisation of composite coatings by computational microstructural modelling," Surface & Coatings Technology, 247, pp. 1–13
- Holmberg, Kenneth; and Erdemir, Ali (2017). "Influence of tribology on global energy consumption," Friction, 5, pp. 263–284
- Holmberg, Kenneth; and Erdemir, Ali (2019). "The impact of tribology on energy use and CO2 emission globally and in combustion engine and electric cars," Tribology International, 135, pp. 389–396
