= Julie Elizabeth Gough =

British cell biologist

Julie Gough
- Born: Julie Elizabeth Gough
- Scientific career
- Fields: Tissue engineering Biomaterials; Scaffolds; Magnesium alloys Self-assembling peptides
- Workplaces: The University of Manchester; Imperial College; University of Nottingham
- Website: www.research.manchester.ac.uk/portal/j.gough.html

Julie Elizabeth Gough is a Professor of Biomaterials and Tissue Engineering at The University of Manchester. She specializes on controlling cellular responses at the cell-biomaterial interface by engineering defined surfaces for mechanically sensitive connective tissues.

== Early life and education ==
Gough is a cell biologist. She studied cell- and immunobiology, and molecular pathology and toxicology at the University of Leicester, graduating with a BSc in 1993 and an MSc in 1994, respectively. She continued her doctoral studies at the University of Nottingham, earning her PhD in Biomaterials in 1998. Between 1998 and 2002, she furthered her studies at both Nottingham and Imperial College London as a postdoctoral fellow working on novel composites and bioactive glasses for bone repair.

== Research and career ==
Gough joined the School of Materials, Faculty of Science and Engineering at The University of Manchester, as a lecturer in 2002. She was quickly promoted to Senior lecturer and Reader in 2006 and 2010, respectively.

From 2012 to 2013 she was a Royal Academy of Engineering/Leverhulme Trust Senior Research Fellow. Gough was made full Professor in 2014.

Since then, she has continued her research in tissue engineering of mechanically sensitive connective tissues such as bone, cartilage, skeletal muscle and the intervertebral disc. This includes analysis and control of cells such as osteoblasts, chondrocytes, fibroblasts, keratinocytes, myoblasts and macrophages on a variety of materials and scaffolds. Her research also involves the development of scaffolds for tissue repair using novel hydrogels and magnesium alloys as various porous and fibrous materials. Gough has worked on the advisory board of the journal Biomaterials Science, and as part of the local organising committee for the World Biomaterials Congress.
