= Camille Petit =

French chemist

- Education: École nationale supérieure de chimie de Montpellier; CUNY Graduate Center
- Scientific career
- Workplaces: Columbia University; Imperial College London
- Thesis: Factors Affecting the Removal of Ammonia from Air on Carbonaceous Materials (2011)
- Doctoral advisor: Teresa Bandosz
- Website: http://www.imperial.ac.uk/multifunctional-nanomaterials/

Camille Petit is a professor in Chemical Engineering at Imperial College London. She designs and characterises functional materials for environmental sustainability.

== Early life and education ==
Petit completed her MSc in chemistry at the École nationale supérieure de chimie de Montpellier in 2007. She earned her PhD at Graduate Center of the City University of New York in 2011, working with Teresa Bandosz. She was awarded the Springer Nature thesis award in 2012, for her dissertation Factors Affecting the Removal of Ammonia from Air on Carbonaceous Materials.

== Research and career ==
Petit completed postdoctoral research in Alissa Park's group at Columbia University. She worked on carbon capture using nanoparticle organic hybrid materials (NOHMs). She synthesises them by ionic grafting polymer chains onto polyhedral oligomeric silsesquioxane (POSS). She developed several characterisation techniques to analyse their suitability for carbon capture, including nuclear magnetic resonance, Attenuated total reflectance Fourier-transform infrared spectroscopy and differential scanning calorimetry. In 2011 she was awarded the French Carbon Group award. In 2013 Petit joined the Department of Chemical Engineering at Imperial College London. She leads the Multifunctional Materials Laboratory. Here she develops nano-colloids, graphene-based materials, nitride and metal-organic frameworks. She has delivered several public lectures.

Petit is Associate Editor of the journal Frontiers in Energy - Carbon Capture, Storage, and Utilization. In 2019 she was awarded a prestigious European Research Council grant to develop a new class of photocatalysts to help convert carbon dioxide into fuel using sunlight.

=== Honours and awards ===
- 2007 - American Carbon Society Mrozowski Award
- 2015 - Institution of Chemical Engineers Sir Frederick Warner medal
- 2017 - Institute of Materials, Minerals and Mining Silver Medal
- 2017 - American Institute of Chemical Engineers 35 under 35
- 2019 - Philip Leverhulme Prize 2019
