= Ultramicroscopy =

- Discipline: Electron microscopy
- Language: English
- Edited by: Angus Kirkland

Publication details
- History: 1975–present
- Publisher: Elsevier
- Frequency: Monthly
- Impact factor: 2.6 (2025)

Standard abbreviations
- ISO 4: Ultramicroscopy

Indexing
- CODEN: ULTRD6
- ISSN: 0304-3991 (print); 1879-2723 (web)
- LCCN: sf90091881
- OCLC no.: 02246092

Links
- Journal homepage; Online archive

Ultramicroscopy is a peer-reviewed scientific journal in the field of electron microscopy. It is published by Elsevier and the editor-in-chief is Angus Kirkland. It provides a forum for the publication of original research papers, invited reviews and rapid communications.

== Abstracting and indexing ==
The journal is abstracted and indexed in: Scopus and the Science Citation Index Expanded.

== See also ==
- Electron backscatter diffraction
- Transmission electron microscopy
- Materials science
