= Sarah Haigh =

British microscopist

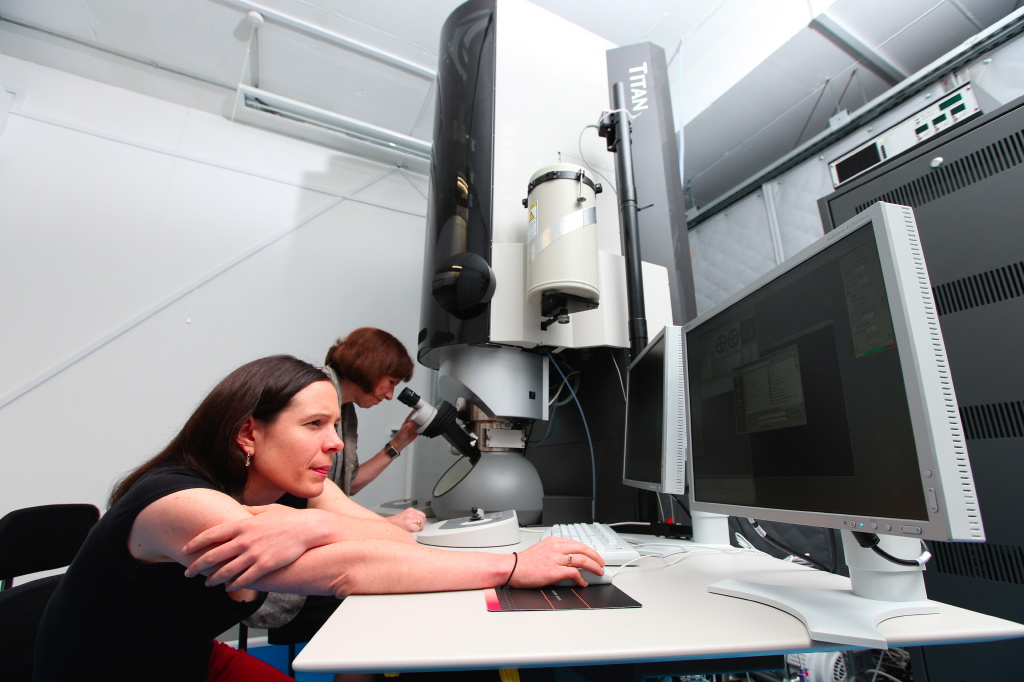
- Haigh at electron microscope in 2015
- Born: Sarah Jane Haigh
- Education: University of Oxford (BA, DPhil)
- Awards: IOM3 Silver Medal (2013); IOM3 Rosenhain Medal (2017)
- Scientific career
- Fields: Material Science; Electron microscopy 2D materials nanoparticles
- Workplaces: Jeol; University of Manchester
- Thesis: Super Resolution Tilt Series Exit Wave Restoration from Aberration Corrected Images (2007)
- Doctoral advisor: Angus Kirkland
- Website: www.research.manchester.ac.uk/portal/sarah.haigh.html

Sarah Jane Haigh is a professor in the School of Materials at the University of Manchester. She investigates nanomaterials using transmission electron microscopy, including two-dimensional materials such as graphene.

== Early life and education ==
Haigh studied materials science at the University of Oxford, where she was a member of St Anne's College, Oxford. During her undergraduate studies she worked at the aluminium company Rio Tinto Alcan. She used nanoscale secondary ion mass spectrometry to study titanium doped magnesium diboride during her undergraduate studies. She won the Institute of Materials, Minerals and Mining (IOM3) Prize for Best Overall Performance in Parts I and II. Whilst an undergraduate, at the UK 2004 Materials Congress, Haigh won the best poster award. Haigh won the Morgan Crucible Award for the best Materials student in the UK.

Haigh earned her Doctor of Philosophy degree focussing on the development of exit wave restoration for high resolution Transmission Electron Microscopy (TEM), working under the supervision of Angus Kirkland. She won the Worshipful Company of Ironmongers Prize for Best Poster in 2007. She visited JEOL in Japan to test instruments before installing them in Oxford.

== Research and career ==
After completing her PhD in 2008, Haigh worked as an application specialist for JEOL and spent two years working with the Nelson Mandela University in the Centre for High Resolution Transmission Electron Microscopy. She co-edited Nannocharacterisation with Kirkland in 2014.

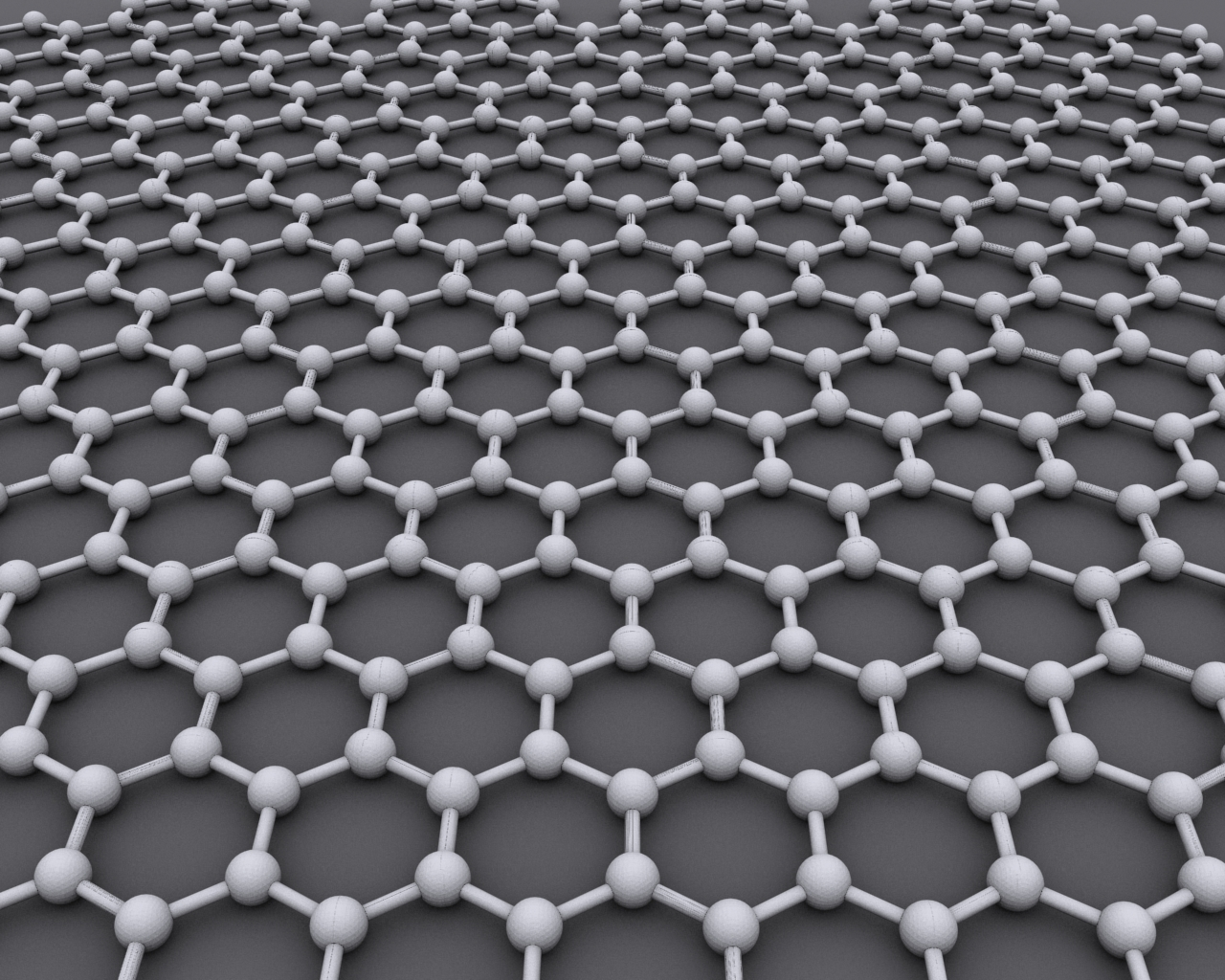
A two-dimensional graphene sheet

Haigh joined the University of Manchester in 2010. Within two weeks she had put out a tender for a TEM, and secured one that allowed her to do high sensitivity Energy-dispersive X-ray spectroscopy. She is interested in electron tomography and elemental imaging of nanomaterials. She has also investigated the changes that occur during wet chemical processes.

Working at the University of Manchester, Haigh became interested in graphene and other 2D materials. She is a member of the National Graphene Institute. Haigh has used TEM to study graphene-boron nitride heterostructures and found that hydrocarbons group in isolated pockets. She used focused ion beam TEM to reveal that graphene layers within electronic devices have perfect alignment. Haigh has discussed 2D materials on BBC Radio 4. She won the 2013 IOM3 Silver Medal for her research and education activities. She used a graphene 'petri dish' to help image nanomaterials, using graphene-boron nitride liquid crystal cells. She demonstrated that graphene-oxide membranes could be used as a sieve to remove the salt from seawater. In 2018 her group identified a new bending behaviour in 2D Materials, that folds were delocalised over several atoms. She demonstrated that catalytic materials could be used to recover energy from waste water.

Haigh was appointed at the University of Manchester as a lecturer in 2010, and in 2015 Haigh was promoted to Reader. In 2015, Haigh was quoted saying "I was promoted to Reader last year and I'd like to see myself as a Professor within the next five to ten years" and in 2018 Haigh was promoted to Professor (i.e. a Personal Chair).

She is a member of the committee of the Worshipful Company of Armourers and Brasiers, and was elected to join as a freeman in 2009. She serves on the advisory board of the EPSRC SuperSTEM laboratory in Daresbury. She won the 2017 Institute of Materials, Minerals and Mining Rosenhain Medal.

Haigh was Chair of the Institute of Physics EMAG group (2016–2018) and EMAG Honorary Secretary and Treasurer (2014–2016), a member of council for the RMS (2014–2018).

== Awards and honours ==
In 2018 she applied for Freedom of the City of Manchester. Her awards and honours include:

- 2017 IOM3 Rosenhain Medal
- 2013 IOM3 Silver Medal
