= Nature Catalysis =

- Discipline: Catalysis
- Language: English
- Edited by: Davide Esposito

Publication details
- History: 2018–present
- Publisher: Nature Portfolio (United Kingdom)
- Frequency: Monthly
- Open access: Hybrid
- Impact factor: 42.8 (2023)

Standard abbreviations
- ISO 4: Nat. Catal.

Indexing
- CODEN: NCAACP
- ISSN: 2520-1158
- LCCN: 2018229711
- OCLC no.: 1005081578

Links
- Journal homepage; Online archive

Nature Catalysis is a monthly peer-reviewed scientific journal published by Nature Portfolio. It was established in 2018. The editor-in-chief is Davide Esposito.

== Abstracting and indexing ==
The journal is abstracted and indexed in:

- Compendex
- Science Citation Index Expanded
- Scopus

According to the Journal Citation Reports, the journal has a 2023 impact factor of 42.8, ranking it 3rd out of 163 journals in the category "Chemistry, Physical".
