= École nationale supérieure de chimie de Montpellier =

French engineering College in Chemistry

Coordinates: 43°37′16″N 3°52′05″E

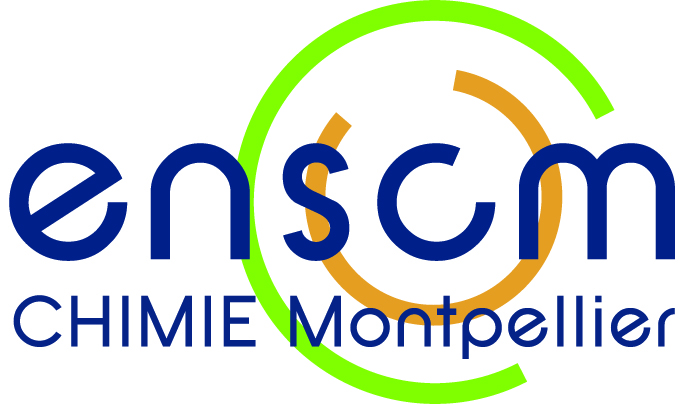
- Type: Education - Research Grande École
- Established: 1889
- Location: Montpellier, France
- Website: www.enscm.fr

The École Nationale Supérieure de Chimie de Montpellier, or ENSCM, is one of the French Grandes Ecoles, situated in Montpellier. Although it may share academic staff and research activities with the University as well as research bodies such as CNRS, the ENSCM has a particular status as an independent body with its own research laboratories.

Teaching chemistry in Montpellier started in 1676 with the creation of the first chair of chemistry at the University of Medicine. Later on, in 1803 the School of Pharmacy was established with a chair of Chemistry and then the Faculty of Science in 1809. The original Institute of Chemistry was founded in 1889 in order to gather the professors who were teaching the same subjects in different Faculties. In 1934, it left the old historic centre to settle in larger and more functional new buildings.

It also acquired new facilities on a second site, 3 kilometers away from the main one, called "La Galéra", which is equipped with a kilo-lab and on a third site, close to Montpellier 2 University : the "Institut Européen des Membranes".

Since 2017, the ENSCM has moved into its new premises within the Pole Balard Formation located on Avenue du Professeur Emile Jeanbrau, just beside the "Institut Européen des Membranes".

The ENSCM provides high level training for engineers and researchers in Chemistry and is renowned for its research activities in the following fields:

- Macromolecular Chemistry (particularly Heterochemistry)
- Soft Chemistry
- Design and development of solids (macromolecules, hybrid materials, catalytic materials and membranes), study of the properties and uses of these materials.

Research is carried out in “Unités Mixtes de Recherche”

- UMR 5076 : Molecular and Macromolecular Heterochemistry
- UMR 5618 : Catalytic Materials and Catalysis in Organic Chemistry
- UMR 5635 : Institut Européen des Membranes.

Some ENSCM Professors and researchers are members of a team carrying out research in the field of Biology and Health : Health Pharmacology and Biotechnologies Centre, CNRS, Montpellier 2 University, University of Montpellier.

The ENSCM is also a member of the “Fédération Gay Lussac” – network of “Grandes Ecoles” gathering 17 Schools of Chemistry and Chemical Engineering. Within this network, the ENSCM ranks very high both by the level of the student it recruits and the importance of the research activities carried out in its internationally renowned laboratories.
