= High-resolution transmission electron microscopy =

Imaging mode of electron microscopes

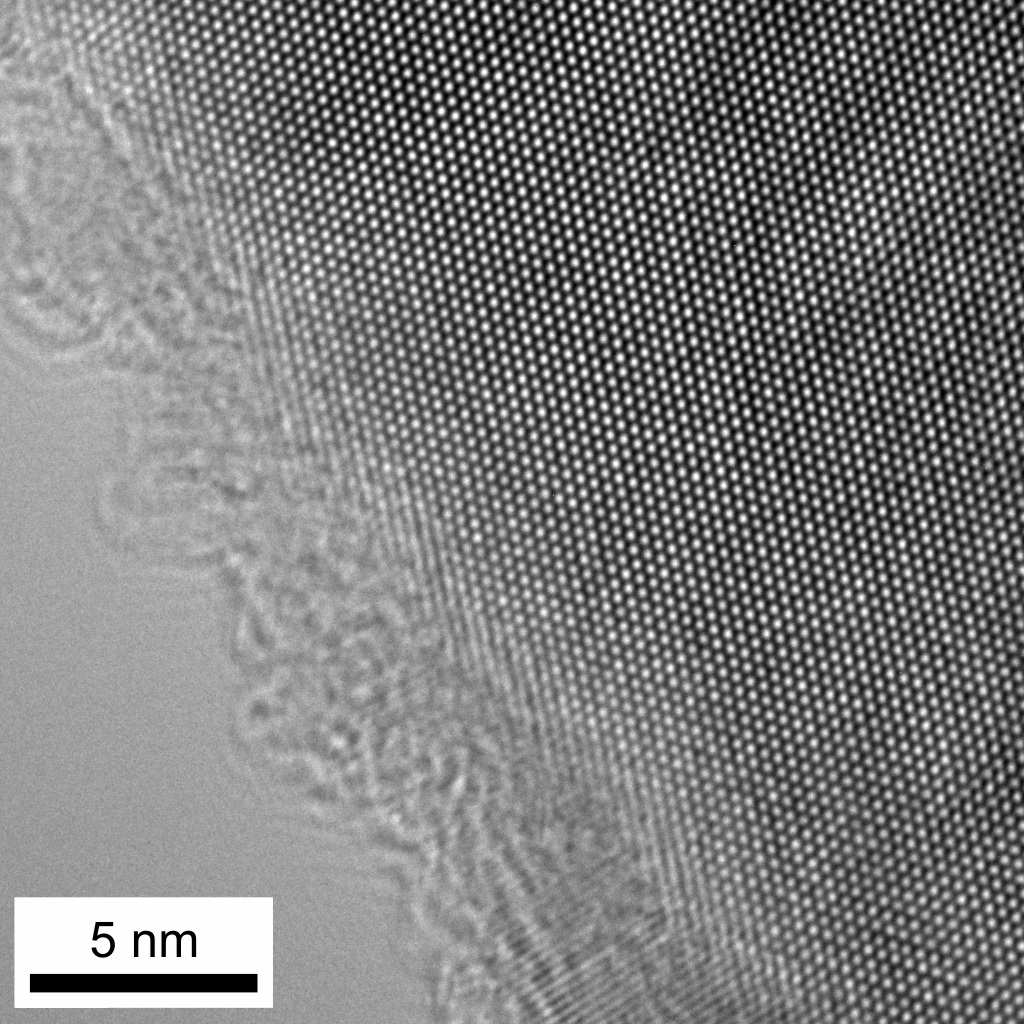
High-resolution image of magnesium sample.

High-resolution transmission electron microscopy is an imaging mode of specialized transmission electron microscopes that allows for direct imaging of the atomic structure of samples. It is a powerful tool to study properties of materials on the atomic scale, such as semiconductors, metals, nanoparticles and sp^{2}-bonded carbon (e.g., graphene, nanotubes). While this term is often also used to refer to high resolution scanning transmission electron microscopy, mostly in high angle annular dark field mode, this article describes mainly the imaging of an object by recording the two-dimensional spatial wave amplitude distribution in the image plane, similar to a "classic" light microscope. For disambiguation, the technique is also sometimes referred to as phase contrast transmission electron microscopy. At present, the highest point resolution realised in high resolution transmission electron microscopy is around 0.5 ångströms (0.050 nm). At these small scales, individual atoms of a crystal and defects can be resolved. For 3-dimensional crystals, it is necessary to combine several views, taken from different angles, into a 3D map. This technique is called electron tomography.

One of the difficulties with high resolution transmission electron microscopy is that image formation relies on phase contrast. In phase-contrast imaging, contrast is not intuitively interpretable, as the image is influenced by aberrations of the imaging lenses in the microscope. The largest contributions for uncorrected instruments typically come from defocus, spherical aberration and astigmatism of the objective lens. These values can be estimated from the so-called Thon ring pattern (named for Friedrich Thon) appearing in the Fourier transform modulus of an image of a thin amorphous film.

== Image contrast and interpretation ==
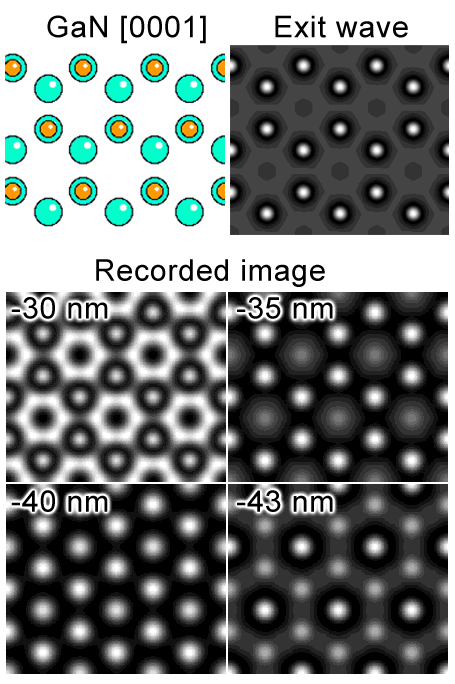
Simulated HREM images for GaN[0001]

The contrast of a high resolution transmission electron microscopy image arises from the interference in the image plane of the electron wave with itself. Due to our inability to record the phase of an electron wave, only the amplitude in the image plane is recorded. However, a large part of the structure information of the sample is contained in the phase of the electron wave. In order to detect it, the aberrations of the microscope (like defocus) have to be tuned in a way that converts the phase of the wave at the specimen exit plane into amplitudes in the image plane.

The interaction of the electron wave with the crystallographic structure of the sample is complex, but a qualitative idea of the interaction can readily be obtained. Each imaging electron interacts independently with the sample. Above the sample, the wave of an electron can be approximated as a plane wave incident on the sample surface. As it penetrates the sample, it is attracted by the positive atomic potentials of the atom cores, and channels along the atom columns of the crystallographic lattice (s-state model). At the same time, the interaction between the electron wave in different atom columns leads to Bragg diffraction. The exact description of dynamical scattering of electrons in a sample not satisfying the weak phase object approximation, which is almost all real samples, still remains the holy grail of electron microscopy. However, the physics of electron scattering and electron microscope image formation are sufficiently well known to allow accurate simulation of electron microscope images.

As a result of the interaction with a crystalline sample, the electron exit wave right below the sample φ_{e}(x,u) as a function of the spatial coordinate x is a superposition of a plane wave and a multitude of diffracted beams with different in plane spatial frequencies u (spatial frequencies correspond to scattering angles, or distances of rays from the optical axis in a diffraction plane). The phase change φ_{e}(x,u) relative to the incident wave peaks at the location of the atom columns. The exit wave now passes through the imaging system of the microscope where it undergoes further phase change and interferes as the image wave in the imaging plane (mostly a digital pixel detector like a CCD camera). The recorded image is not a direct representation of the samples crystallographic structure. For instance, high intensity might or might not indicate the presence of an atom column in that precise location (see simulation). The relationship between the exit wave and the image wave is a highly nonlinear one and is a function of the aberrations of the microscope. It is described by the contrast transfer function.

=== The phase contrast transfer function ===
The phase contrast transfer function is a function of limiting apertures and aberrations in the imaging lenses of a microscope. It describes their effect on the phase of the exit wave φ_{e}(x,u) and propagates it to the image wave. Following Williams and Carter, assume the weak phase object approximation (thin sample), then the contrast transfer function becomes

$$CTF(u)=A(u)E(u)2\sin(\chi(u))$$

where A(u) is the aperture function, E(u) describes the attenuation of the wave for higher spatial frequency u, also called envelope function. χ(u) is a function of the aberrations of the electron optical system.

The last, sinusoidal term of the contrast transfer function will determine the sign with which components of frequency u will enter contrast in the final image. If one takes into account only spherical aberration to third order and defocus, χ is rotationally symmetric about the optical axis of the microscope and thus only depends on the modulus u = |u|, given by

$$\chi(u)=\frac{\pi}{2}C_s\lambda^3u^4-\pi \Delta f \lambda u^2$$

where C_{s} is the spherical aberration coefficient, λ is the electron wavelength, and Δf is the defocus. In transmission electron microscopy, defocus can easily be controlled and measured to high precision. Thus one can easily alter the shape of the contrast transfer function by defocusing the sample. Contrary to optical applications, defocusing can increase the precision and interpretability of the micrographs.

The aperture function cuts off beams scattered above a certain critical angle (given by the objective pole piece for ex), thus effectively limiting the attainable resolution. However it is the envelope function E(u) which usually dampens the signal of beams scattered at high angles, and imposes a maximum to the transmitted spatial frequency. This maximum determines the highest resolution attainable with a microscope and is known as the information limit. E(u) can be described as a product of single envelopes:

$$E(u)=E_s(u)E_c(u)E_d(u)E_v(u)E_D(u),\,$$

due to

E_{s}(u): angular spread of the source
E_{c}(u): chromatic aberration
E_{d}(u): specimen drift
E_{v}(u): specimen vibration
E_{D}(u): detector

Specimen drift and vibration can be minimized in a stable environment. It is usually the spherical aberration C_{s} that limits spatial coherency and defines E_{s}(u) and the chromatic aberration C_{c}, together with current and voltage instabilities that define the temporal coherency in E_{c}(u). These two envelopes determine the information limit by damping the signal transfer in Fourier space with increasing spatial frequency u

$$E_s(u) = \exp\left[-\left(\frac{\pi\alpha}{\lambda}\right)^2 \left(\frac{\delta\Chi(u)}{\delta u}\right)^2\right] = \exp\left[-\left(\frac{\pi\alpha}{\lambda}\right)^2(C_s\lambda^3u^3+\Delta f\lambda u)^2\right],$$

where α is the semiangle of the pencil of rays illuminating the sample. Clearly, if the wave aberration ('here represented by C_{s} and Δf) vanished, this envelope function would be a constant one. In case of an uncorrected transmission electron microscope with fixed C_{s}, the damping due to this envelope function can be minimized by optimizing the defocus at which the image is recorded (Lichte defocus).

The temporal envelope function can be expressed as

$$E_c(u) = \exp\left[-\frac{1}{2}\left(\pi\lambda\delta\right)^2u^4\right]$$.

Here, δ is the focal spread with the chromatic aberration C_{c} as the parameter:

$$\delta = C_c\sqrt{4\left(\frac{\Delta I_\text{obj}}{I_\text{obj}}\right)^2 + \left(\frac{\Delta E}{V_\text{acc}}\right)^2 + \left(\frac{\Delta V_\text{acc}}{V_\text{acc}}\right)^2},$$

The terms $\Delta I_\text{obj}/I_\text{obj}$ and $\Delta V_\text{acc}/V_\text{acc}$ represent instabilities in of the total current in the magnetic lenses and the acceleration voltage. $\Delta E/V_\text{acc}$ is the energy spread of electrons emitted by the source.

The information limit of current state-of-the-art transmission electron microscopes is well below 1 Å. The TEAM project at Lawrence Berkeley National Laboratory resulted in the first transmission electron microscope to reach an information limit of <0.5 Å in 2009 by the use of a highly stable mechanical and electrical environment, an ultra-bright, monochromated electron source and double-hexapole aberration correctors.

=== Optimum defocus in high resolution transmission electron microscopy ===
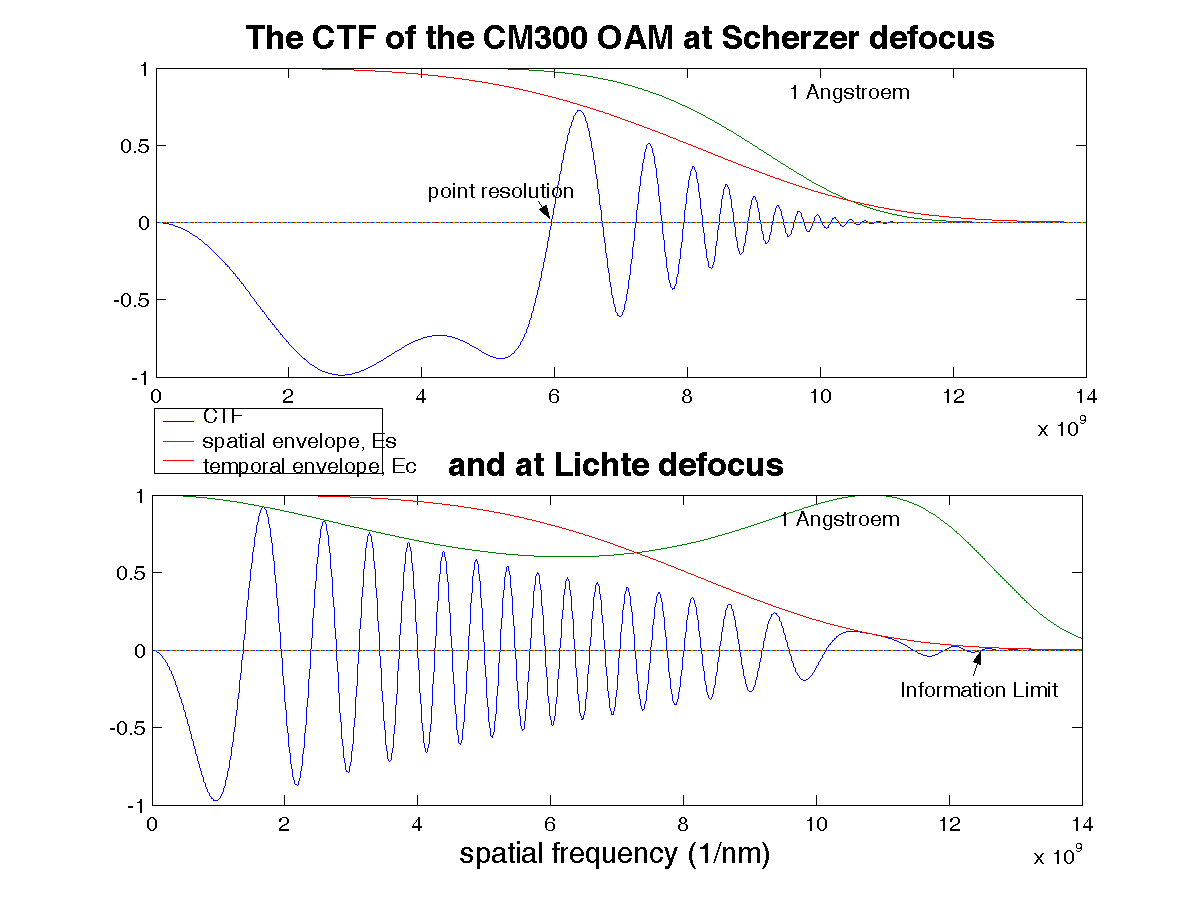
contrast transfer function of the OAM microscope

Choosing the optimum defocus is crucial to fully exploit the capabilities of an electron microscope in high resolution transmission electron microscopy mode. However, there is no simple answer as to which one is the best.

In Gaussian focus one sets the defocus to zero, the sample is in focus. As a consequence contrast in the image plane gets its image components from the minimal area of the sample, the contrast is localized (no blurring and information overlap from other parts of the sample). The contrast transfer function becomes a function that oscillates quickly with C_{s}u^{4}. This means that for certain diffracted beams with a spatial frequency u the contribution to contrast in the recorded image will be reversed, thus making interpretation of the image difficult.

==== Scherzer defocus ====
In Scherzer defocus, one aims to counter the term in u^{4} with the parabolic term Δfu^{2} of χ(u). Thus by choosing the right defocus value Δf one flattens χ(u) and creates a wide band where low spatial frequencies u are transferred into image intensity with a similar phase. In 1949, Scherzer found that the optimum defocus depends on microscope properties like the spherical aberration C_{s} and the accelerating voltage (through λ) in the following way:

$$\Delta f_\text{Scherzer}=-1.2\sqrt{C_s\lambda}\,$$

where the factor 1.2 defines the extended Scherzer defocus. For the CM300 at NCEM, C_{s} = 0.6mm and an accelerating voltage of 300keV (λ = 1.97 pm) (Wavelength calculation) result in Δf_{Scherzer} = -41.25 nm.

The point resolution of a microscope is defined as the spatial frequency u_{res} where the contrast transfer function crosses the abscissa for the first time. At Scherzer defocus this value is maximized:

$$u_\text{res}(\text{Scherzer})=0.6\lambda^{3/4} C_s^{1/4},$$

which corresponds to 6.1 nm^{−1} on the CM300. Contributions with a spatial frequency higher than the point resolution can be filtered out with an appropriate aperture leading to easily interpretable images at the cost of a lot of information lost.

==== Gabor defocus ====
Gabor defocus is used in electron holography where both amplitude and phase of the image wave are recorded. One thus wants to minimize crosstalk between the two. The Gabor defocus can be expressed as a function of the Scherzer defocus as

$$\Delta f_\text{Gabor}=0.56\Delta f_\text{Scherzer}$$

==== Lichte defocus ====
To exploit all beams transmitted through the microscope up to the information limit, one relies on a complex method called exit wave reconstruction which consists in mathematically reversing the effect of the contrast transfer function to recover the original exit wave φ_{e}(x,u). To maximize the information throughput, Hannes Lichte proposed in 1991 a defocus of a fundamentally different nature than the Scherzer defocus: because the dampening of the envelope function scales with the first derivative of χ(u), Lichte proposed a focus minimizing the modulus of dχ(u)/du

$\Delta f_\text{Lichte}=-0.75 C_s(u_\max\lambda)^2,$

where u_{max} is the maximum transmitted spatial frequency. For the CM300 with an information limit of 0.8 Å Lichte defocus lies at −272 nm.

=== Exit wave reconstruction ===
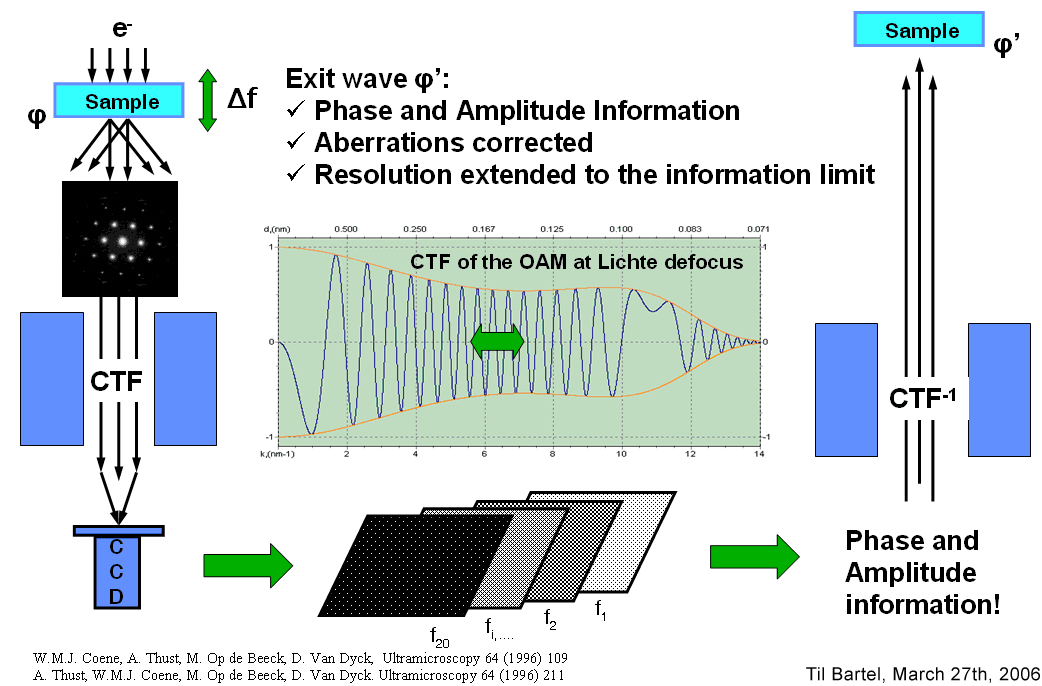
Exit wave reconstruction through focal series

To calculate back to φ_{e}(x,u) the wave in the image plane is back propagated numerically to the sample. If all properties of the microscope are well known, it is possible to recover the real exit wave with very high accuracy.

First however, both phase and amplitude of the electron wave in the image plane must be measured. As our instruments only record amplitudes, an alternative method to recover the phase has to be used. There are two methods in use today:

- Holography, which was developed by Gabor expressly for transmission electron microscopy applications, uses a prism to split the beam into a reference beam and a second one passing through the sample. Phase changes between the two are then translated in small shifts of the interference pattern, which allows recovering both phase and amplitude of the interfering wave.
- Through focal series method takes advantage of the fact that the contrast transfer function is focus dependent. A series of about 20 pictures is shot under the same imaging conditions with the exception of the focus which is incremented between each take. Together with exact knowledge of the contrast transfer function, the series allows for computation of φ_{e}(x,u) (see figure).

Both methods extend the point resolution of the microscope past the information limit, which is the highest possible resolution achievable on a given machine. The ideal defocus value for this type of imaging is known as Lichte defocus and is usually several hundred nanometers negative.

== See also ==
- Electron beam induced deposition
- Electron diffraction
- Electron energy loss spectroscopy (EELS)
- Electron microscope
- Energy filtered transmission electron microscopy
- Scanning confocal electron microscopy
- Scanning electron microscope
- Scanning transmission electron microscope
- Talbot Effect
- Transmission Electron Aberration-corrected Microscope
- Transmission Electron Microscopy

== Articles ==
- Topical review "Optics of high-performance electron Microscopes" Sci. Technol. Adv. Mater. 9 (2008) 014107 (30pages) free download
- CTF Explorer by Max V. Sidorov, freeware program to calculate the contrast transfer function
- High Resolution Transmission Electron Microscopy Overview
