= John C. H. Spence =

Australian physicist (1946–2021)

John Spence
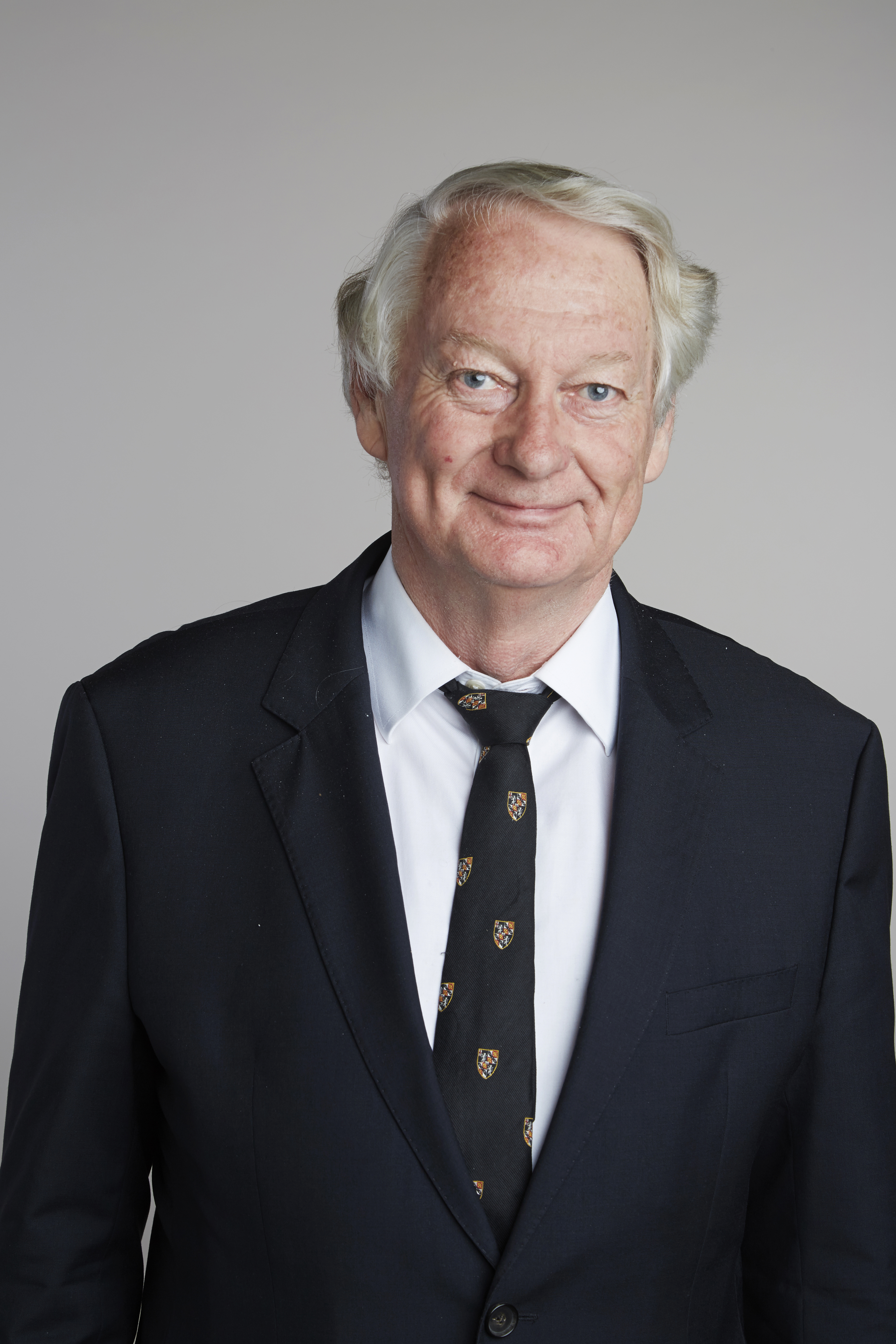
- Spence in 2015, portrait via the Royal Society
- Born: John Charles Howorth Spence; 21 April 1946; Canberra, Australia
- Died: 28 June 2021 (aged 75); Boston, Massachusetts, U.S.
- Education: University of Melbourne (PhD)
- Awards: ForMemRS (2015); FInstP; Gregori Aminoff Prize (2021)
- Scientific career
- Fields: Physics; Free-electron lasers; High-resolution transmission electron microscopy
- Workplaces: University of Oxford; Arizona State University
- Thesis: Double plasmon studies in several metals (1973)
- Doctoral advisor: Alan Spargo
- Other academic advisors: Peter Hirsch; David Cockayne; Michael Whelan; John M. Cowley
- Website: www.public.asu.edu/~jspence; www.bioxfel.org/people/spence

John Charles Howorth Spence ForMemRS HonFRMS (21 April 1946 – 28 June 2021) was Richard Snell Professor of Physics at Arizona State University and Director of Science at the National Science Foundation BioXFEL Science and Technology Center.

== Education ==
Spence was educated at the University of Melbourne where he was awarded a PhD in 1973 for work on double plasmon studies of metals under the supervision of Alan Spargo. He conducted postdoctoral research at University of Oxford under Sir Peter Hirsch, David Cockayne and Michael Whelan, and then at Arizona State University under John M. Cowley, working alongside Sumio Iijima, Ondrej Krivanek and David J. Smith. Later, he established his own group at Arizona State University.

== Awards and honours ==
Spence was elected a Foreign Member of the Royal Society (ForMemRS) in 2015. His nomination reads:

John Spence is distinguished for his innovative world-leading contributions to both biology and materials science. He co-led the team which conceived the first application of X-ray free-electron lasers (XFEL) to structural biology using protein nanocrystals and he pioneered femtosecond serial crystallography. He is also a world leader in the development and application of atomic-resolution electron microscopy and its use for the study of atomic defects in crystals and semiconductors. For example, he co-invented a widely used technique for locating impurity atoms in nanocrystals, for directly and accurately imaging the chemical bonds between atoms, and published the first observation of dislocation kinks, at atomic resolution. He has developed new microscopies and spectroscopies which have given scientists new eyes to understand atomic processes in solids.

In 2017, he was made an Honorary Fellow of the Royal Microscopical Society (HonFRMS) for his contributions to microscopy. Spence was a (corresponding) Fellow of the Australian Academy of Science, and the author of the book "Lightspeed" (OUP 2019) on the history of attempts to measure the speed of light leading to Einstein's theories. For 2021 he was awarded the Gregori Aminoff Prize. He died in 2021.

== Bibliography ==
=== Monograph and handbook ===
- Spence, John C. H.; Zuo, J. M. (1992). Electron microdiffraction. New York: Plenum Press. ISBN 0-306-44262-0. OCLC 26634670.
- Science of microscopy. P. W. Hawkes, John C. H. Spence. New York: Springer. 2007. ISBN 978-0-387-25296-4. OCLC 288524612.
- Spence, John C. H. (2013). High-resolution electron microscopy (4th ed.). Oxford. ISBN 978-0-19-150840-0. OCLC 862086211.
- Zuo, Jian Min; Spence, John C. H. (2017). Advanced transmission electron microscopy: imaging and diffraction in nanoscience. New York, NY. ISBN 978-1-4939-6607-3. OCLC 962017350.
- Springer handbook of microscopy. P. W. Hawkes, John C. H. Spence. Cham, Switzerland. 2019. ISBN 978-3-030-00069-1. OCLC 1126315044.

=== Nonfiction ===
- Spence, John C. H. (2020). Lightspeed: the ghostly aether and the race to measure the speed of light. Oxford, United Kingdom. ISBN 978-0-19-884196-8. OCLC 1126585794.
- Spence, John C. H. (2021). Spitfire pilot : Lou Spence: a story of bravery, leadership and love. Torquay, Victoria. ISBN 978-1-920785-00-0. OCLC 1265060680.

== See also ==
- Henry N. Chapman
- Sumio Iijima
- Serial femtosecond crystallography
