= International Federation of Societies for Microscopy =

Non-governmental organization

- Fédération internationale des sociétés de microscopie électronique
- Abbreviation: IFSM
- Formation: October 1951; 75 years ago
- Type: INGO
- Location: Illinois, USA
- Members: 36 national members and 7 associate members
- Official languages: English, French, Spanish, German
- President: Eva Olsson
- Vice President: Angus Kirkland
- Website: ifsm.info
- Formerly called: Joint Commission for Electron Microscopy; International Federation of Electron Microscope Societies; International Federation of Societies for Electron Microscopy

The International Federation of Societies for Microscopy (French: Fédération internationale des sociétés de microscopie électronique; Spanish: Federación Internacional de Sociedades de Microscopia Electrónica; German: Internationaler Verband der Gesellschaften für Elektronenmikroskopie) is an international non-governmental organization representing microscopy. It currently has 36 national members and 7 associate members, which are split into three regional committees, the Committee for Asia-Pacific Societies of Microscopy, the European Microscopy Society and the Interamerica Committee for Societies for EM.

== History ==
The IFSM was created in October 1951 by the International Council for Science (ICSU) as the Joint Commission for Electron Microscopy. In July 1955, it became an independent federation following the meeting of national societies representing electron microscopy from the nations of Belgium, France, Germany, Great Britain, Japan, the Netherlands, Scandinavia (Denmark, Sweden and Norway), Switzerland and the United States, forming the International Federation of Electron Microscope Societies, with the view of furthering international co-operation between microscopists.

In 1958, the federation changed its name to the International Federation of Societies for Electron Microscopy following the joining of national societies representing Czechoslovakia, Hungary, Italy and Spain. In 1976 it joined the International Council for Science. In 2002, the word "Electron" was dropped creating the current name International Federation of Societies for Microscopy.

== Presidents ==
- Bodo von Borries, 1954–1955.
- Ernst Ruska, 1956–1957.
- Thomas F. Anderson, 1958–1961.
- Noboru Higashi, 1962–1965.
- Gaston Dupouy, 1966–1969.
- Vernon Ellis Cosslett, 1970–1973.
- Don W. Fawcett, 1974–1977.
- Jan B. Le Poole, 1978–1981.
- Hatsujiro Hashimoto, 1982–1985.
- Gareth Thomas, 1986–1989.
- Elmar Zeitler, 1990–1993.
- Arvid Maunsbach, 1994–1997. President of the Nordic Microscopy Society (SCANDEM) 1977–1980.
- Archie Howie, 1998–2001.
- David Cockayne, President from 2003 to 2007 (or 2002-2005), vice-president 1994–1997 and 2007–2010.
- Christian Colliex, president 2006–2009. Later Vice President.
- C. Barry Carter, President 2010–2013. Later Vice President.
- Kazuo Furuya, 2014–2017. Later Vice President
- Angus Kirkland, 2018–2023 Current Vice President
- Eva Olsson, 2024-Current

== Membership ==
=== European Microscopy Society ===
Listed below are the bodies which are members of the European Microscopy Society. All those listed have reciprocal membership agreements. It has 28 member countries.

==== National bodies ====
- Armenian Electron Microscopy Society (AEMS)
- Austrian Society for Electron Microscopy (ASEM)
- Belgian Society for Microscopy (BSM)
- Croatian Microscopy Society (CMS)
- Czechoslovak Microscopy Society (CSMS)
- Dutch Society for Microscopy (NVvM)
- Electron Microscopy and Analysis Group (Institute of Physics) (EMAG)
- French Microscopy Society (SFμ)
- German Society for Electron Microscopy (DGE)
- Hellenic Microscopy Society (HMS)
- Hungarian Society for Microscopy (HSM)
- Israel Society for Microscopy (ISM)
- Italian Society of Microscopical Sciences (SISM)
- Microscopical Society of Ireland (MSI)
- Nordic Microscopy Society (SCANDEM)
- Polish Society for Microscopy (PTMi)
- Portuguese Society for Microscopy (SPMicros)
- Romanian Electron Microscopy Society (REMS)
- Royal Microscopical Society (RMS)
- Serbian Society for Microscopy (SSM)
- Slovene Society for Microscopy (SDM)
- Spanish Society for Microscopy (SME)
- Swiss Society for Optics and Microscopy (SSOM)
- Turkish Society for Electron Microscopy (TEMD)

==== Other societies ====
- Bulgarian National Committee for Electron Microscopy
- European Microbeam Analysis Society (EMAS)
- Greek Society of Electron Microscopy
- Institute of Physics
- Latvian Society for Electron Microscopy
- Rumanian National Committee for Electron Microscopy
- Russian Academy of Sciences
- Scottish Microscopy Group (SMG)
