= Gareth Thomas (materials scientist) =

Welsh-born American materials scientist (1932–2014)

- Born: August 9, 1932; Maesteg, Wales
- Died: February 7, 2014 (aged 81); Oegstgeest, Netherlands
- Education: University of Wales; University of Cambridge
- Known for: Transmission electron microscopy of materials Microstructure-property relationships Founding role in the National Center for Electron Microscopy
- Scientific career
- Fields: Materials science Electron microscopy
- Workplaces: University of California, Berkeley

Gareth Thomas (9 August 1932 – 6 February 2014) was a Welsh-born materials scientist who spent most of his career at the University of California, Berkeley and Lawrence Berkeley National Laboratory (LBL). He was known for applying transmission electron microscopy to the study of engineering materials and for work relating microstructure to material properties. He was elected to the National Academy of Engineering in 1982 and to the National Academy of Sciences in 1983.

== Early life and education ==
Thomas was born in Maesteg, Wales, on 9 August 1932. He studied metallurgy at the University of Wales, Cardiff, receiving a bachelor of science degree with first class honors in 1952. He then pursued graduate studies at the University of Cambridge, completing a PhD in metallurgy in the mid-1950s in what is now called the Department of Materials Science and Metallurgy.

== Career ==
After early work in industry and consulting, Thomas moved to the United States and joined the University of California, Berkeley, in 1960 as a visiting assistant professor of metallurgy. He switched to a tenure-track position and was promoted through the ranks of faculty, and became a full professor in 1966.

At Berkeley, Thomas established a research program centered on electron microscopy of materials, initially working with a laboratory in the Hearst Memorial Mining Building. His research focused on relating internal structure (microstructure) to material properties and performance, what is now called materials science.

In the period 1970 to the early 1980s there were significant advances in the ability of transmission electron microscopes to image the atomic structure of materials. The National Center for Electron Microscopy at LBL, fully operational in 1983, was a direct result of efforts by Thomas and colleagues including Robert Glaeser and John M. Cowley. In 1976, they proposed a US national facility for advanced electron microscopy. Part of the pitch for the facility was recognition that no single university could afford to equip a laboratory with the powerful microscopes needed for atomic resolution work (at that time high voltage instruments). As a consequence of this the Department of Energy funded a new center at LBL. At the heart of the center was a new high-voltage microscope designed to achieve 0.18 nm resolution, as well as some other new instruments. Thomas served as its scientific director until 1991.

== Research contributions ==
Thomas was among the early researchers to apply transmission electron microscopy to engineering materials, using it to examine microstructure at high resolution and to relate structural features to physical and mechanical properties. His work contributed to the use of electron microscopy as a research tool in materials science, particularly for studying defects, phase transformations, grain boundaries, and nanoscale precipitates in metals, alloys, and ceramics.

In a 1981 study of steel, Thomas and coauthors used atom-probe analysis to examine carbon atom distribution in the steel microstructure.

Thomas's work on steels also led to patented alloy designs. He was the inventor on a United States patent for low-carbon steels designed to combine high strength, toughness, and corrosion resistance.

Thomas's microscopy-based approach extended to magnetic and functional materials. In a 2001 study, Thomas and coauthors investigated the origin of giant magnetoresistance in conventional AlNiCo5 magnets. He also contributed to applications of electron diffraction in biological electron microscopy.

Over his career, he published more than 500 technical papers and held patents related to materials science and engineering.

== Honors and awards ==
Thomas was elected to the National Academy of Engineering in 1982 and the National Academy of Sciences in 1983. He also received major awards from professional societies in materials science and metallurgy, including the Acta Materialia Gold Medal, as well as several honorary doctorates and honorary memberships in academic institutions devoted to the study of metals in Japan, Korea, and India.

Thomas' 70th birthday was recognized by his colleagues with special edition of the journal Nano and Microstructural Design of Advanced Materials. The introduction to the issue hailed Thomas' contributions to the key modern approach to advanced materials design, "microstructural design," based on characterizing materials at the atomic level.

== Professional service ==
Thomas served as president of the Electron Microscopy Society of America in 1975, and of the International Federation of Societies for Electron Microscopy in 1986. He also served as editor-in-chief of Acta Materialia and Scripta Materialia.
