= Mathieu Kociak =

French researcher of nano-optics

- Education: Université Paris-Sud (PhD)
- Scientific career
- Fields: nano-optics
- Workplaces: Laboratoire de Physique des Solides
- Thesis: Supraconductivite et plasmons dans les nanotubes (2001)
- Doctoral advisor: Christian Colliex

Mathieu Kociak is a French researcher of nano-optics at the French UMR Laboratoire de Physique des Solides.

He obtained his Ph.D. from the Université Paris-Sud in 2001 in carbon nanotubes, plasmons and superconductivity, under the supervision of Christian Colliex. He later did a post-doc at Meijo University.

He is the author of numerous peer-reviewed articles which have appeared in such journals as Nano Letters and Physical Review Letters among others.

== Awards ==
Some awards bestowed to Kociak are listed below:

- Guinier Prize from the French Physical Society (2002)
- FEI-EM award from the European Microscopy Society (2012)
