= Martha McCartney =

Martha McCartney may refer to:

- Martha R. McCartney, American physicist
- Martha W. McCartney, American historian

== See also ==
- Martha My Dear, Beatles song named after Paul McCartney's dog Martha
