= IFSM =

- International Federation of Societies for Microscopy
- I_{FSM} – Forward surge current maximum. It is mainly used for diodes.
