= Archibald Howie =

British physicist

Archibald Howie CBE HonFRMS FRS HonFRSE HonFInstP
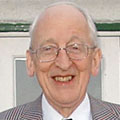
- Born: 8 March 1934 (age 92)
- Education: University of Edinburgh; Trinity College, Cambridge
- Known for: Interpretation of transmission electron microscope images
- Awards: Hughes Medal (1988); Guthrie Medal and Prize (1992); Royal Medal (1999); John Cowley Medal (2018)
- Scientific career
- Fields: Physics
- Workplaces: University of Cambridge; Cavendish Laboratory
- Notable students: John Steeds; Laurence D. Marks

Archibald "Archie" Howie (born 8 March 1934) is a British physicist and emeritus professor at the University of Cambridge, known for his pioneering work on the interpretation of transmission electron microscope images of crystals. Born in 1934, he attended Kirkcaldy High School and the University of Edinburgh. He received his PhD from the University of Cambridge, where he subsequently took up a permanent post. He has been a fellow of Churchill College since its foundation, and was President of its Senior Combination Room (SCR) until 2010.

In 1965, with Hirsch, Whelan, Pashley and Nicholson, he published the seminal text Electron Microscopy of Thin Crystals. He was elected to the Royal Society in 1978 and awarded their Royal Medal in 1999. In 1992 he was awarded the Guthrie Medal and Prize. He was elected an Honorary Fellow of the Royal Society of Edinburgh in 1995. He was head of the Cavendish Laboratory from 1989 to 1997.
