= Turkish Society for Electron Microscopy =

- Founded: 1971
- Type: Professional Organisation and Registered Charity
- Purpose: Electron microscopy
- Location(s): Department of Histology and Embryology; Faculty of Medicine; Acıbadem University; Maltepe, Istanbul
- Region served: Turkey
- Members: 474
- Key people: President: Professor Serap Arbak
- Website: www.temd.org

The Turkish Society for Electron Microscopy (Turkish: Türk Elektron Mikroskopi Derneği; TEMD) is a learned society for the promotion of microscopy in Turkey. It that was founded in 1971 and since then has hosted 19 national congresses on electron microscopy, each with international participation.

Since 2001, the society has been a member of the International Federation of Societies for Microscopy, the European Microscopy Society and International Federation of Societies for Histochemistry and Cytochemistry.
