= Swiss Society for Optics and Microscopy =

- Abbreviation: SSOM
- Formation: 1949; 77 years ago
- Type: Professional Organisation and Registered Charity
- Members: 465 (2016)
- Official languages: English, French, German, Italian, Romansh
- President: Dr Markus Dürrenberger
- Optics Section Vice President: Prof. Dr. Beat Neuenschwander
- Microscopy Section Vice President: Dr. Marco Cantoni
- Nanotechnology Section Vice President: Dr. Harry Heinzelmann
- Website: ssom.ch
- Formerly called: Swiss Committee for Optics

The Swiss Society for Optics and Microscopy (SSOM) (French: Société Suisse d'Optique et de Microscopie Électronique (SSOME); German: Schweizerische Gesellschaft für Optik und Elektronmikroskopie (SGOEM)) is a learned society for the promotion of optics and microscopy (and more recently nanotechnology) in Switzerland.

It is a member of Swiss Academy of Natural Sciences (SCNAT), one of four of the constituent members of the Swiss Academies of Arts and Sciences. It is also a member of the International Commission for Optics, the International Committee on the Science of Photography, the European Optical Committee, the European Optical Society and the European Microscopy Society (regional committee of the International Federation of Societies for Microscopy).

== History ==
Te society was founded on 1949 as the Swiss Committee for Optics. In 1969 following changes in their constitution, it was accepted into the Swiss Academy of Natural Sciences which led its name being changed to the Swiss Society for Optics and Electron Microscopy(Société Suisse d'Optique et de Microscopie Electronique/Schweizerische Gesellschaft für Optik und Elektronenmikroskopie). In 1955 the society was split into two sections, one for electron microscopy and the other for optics, each with their own secretaries.

In 1976, during the 6th European Congress of Electron Microscopy in Jerusalem, SSOM became a founding member of the Committee of European Societies of Electron Microscopy (CESEM), which in 1998 became the European Microscopy Society. In 1987 it joined the European Federation for Applied Optics (Europtica) and the Swiss Academy of Technical Sciences (SATW) (which later become the Swiss Academy of Engineering Sciences).

In 2007 there were 387 individual members and 68 corporate members with 200 delegates, of which 45% were from industry, 40% from academia, and 15% from research institutes.

== Presidents and Secretaries ==
Listed below are the presidents and secretaries of the society from 1947 until 1983.

=== Swiss Committee for Optics (SCO) ===
==== Presidents ====
- H. König, 1947-1952
- N. Schätti, 1953-1954

==== Secretaries ====
- W. Lotmar, 1947-1954

=== Swiss Committee for Photonic and Electronic Optics ===
In French: Comité Suisse d'Optique Photonique et Electronique

==== Presidents ====
- N. Schätti, 1955-1966
- L. Wegmann, 1967-1968

==== Electron Microscopy Secretaries ====
- A. Gautier, 1955-1960
- L. Wegmann, 1961-1966
- M. Gribi, 1967-1968

==== Optics Secretaries ====
- W. Lotmar, 1955-1956
- E. Millet, 1957-1962
- A. Werfeli, 1963-1966
- R. David, 1967-1968

=== Swiss Society for Optics and Electron Microscopy ===
In French: Société Suisse d'Optique et de Microscopie Electronique

==== Presidents ====
- L. Wegmann, 1969-1976
- W. F. Berg, 1977-1980
- J. R. Günter, 1981-1986
- R. Guggenheim, 1987-?

==== Electron Microscopy Secretaries ====
- M. Gribi, 1969-1970
- W. Stäubli, 1971-1972
- G. Kistler, 1973-1976
- J. R. Günter, 1977-1980
- R. Guggenheim, 1981-1986
- R. Gotthardt, 1987-?

==== Optics Secretaries ====
- R. David, 1969-1970
- C. v. Planta, 1971-1972
- F. K. v. Willisen, 1973-1976
- W. Balmer, 1977-1980
- D. Gross, 1981-1982
- E. Mathieu, 1983-?
