= European Microscopy Society =

- Founded: September 1976 as European Societies of Electron Microscopy, current form September 1998
- Type: Professional Organisation and Registered Charity
- Purpose: to promote the use and the quality of advanced microscopy in all its aspects in Europe, with particular reference to developments in instrumentation and methodology and novel applications of all types of microscopy.
- Origins: European Societies of Electron Microscopy
- Region served: Europe, Worldwide
- Members: 5800
- Key people: President Dr Josef Zweck; Secretary Virginie Serin
- Revenue: €47,322.84
- Website: www.eurmicsoc.org

The European Microscopy Society is an international learned society which represents the field of microscopy in Europe. It was founded in 1998 following the disbanding of the Committee of European Societies of Electron Microscopy (which was founded in 1976) as a union of national microscopical societies. The society acts as a regional committee of the International Federation of Societies for Microscopy.

== Member societies ==
Listed below are the bodies which are members of the EMS. All those listed have reciprocal membership agreements. The society has 52 corporate members (ECMA) and 37 individual members, with 28 member countries.

=== National bodies ===
- Armenian Electron Microscopy Society (AEMS)
- Austrian Society for Electron Microscopy (ASEM)
- Belgian Society for Microscopy (BSM)
- Croatian Microscopy Society (CMS)
- Czechoslovak Microscopy Society (CSMS)
- Dutch Society for Microscopy (NVvM)
- Electron Microscopy and Analysis Group (Institute of Physics) (EMAG)
- French Microscopy Society (SFμ)
- German Society for Electron Microscopy (DGE)
- Hellenic Microscopy Society (HMS)
- Hungarian Society for Microscopy (HSM)
- Israel Society for Microscopy (ISM)
- Italian Society of Microscopical Sciences (SISM)
- Microscopical Society of Ireland (MSI)
- Nordic Microscopy Society (SCANDEM)
- Polish Society for Microscopy (PTMi)
- Portuguese Society for Microscopy (SPMicros)
- Romanian Electron Microscopy Society (REMS)
- Royal Microscopical Society (RMS)
- Serbian Society for Microscopy (SSM)
- Slovene Society for Microscopy (SDM)
- Spanish Society for Microscopy (SME)
- Swiss Society for Optics and Microscopy (SSOM)
- Turkish Society for Electron Microscopy (TEMD)

=== Other societies ===
- Bulgarian National Committee for Electron Microscopy
- European Microbeam Analysis Society (EMAS)
- Greek Society of Electron Microscopy
- Institute of Physics
- Latvian Society for Electron Microscopy
- Rumanian National Committee for Electron Microscopy
- Russian Academy of Sciences
- Scottish Microscopy Group (SMG)
