= Hughes Medal =

Award presented by the Royal Society since 1902

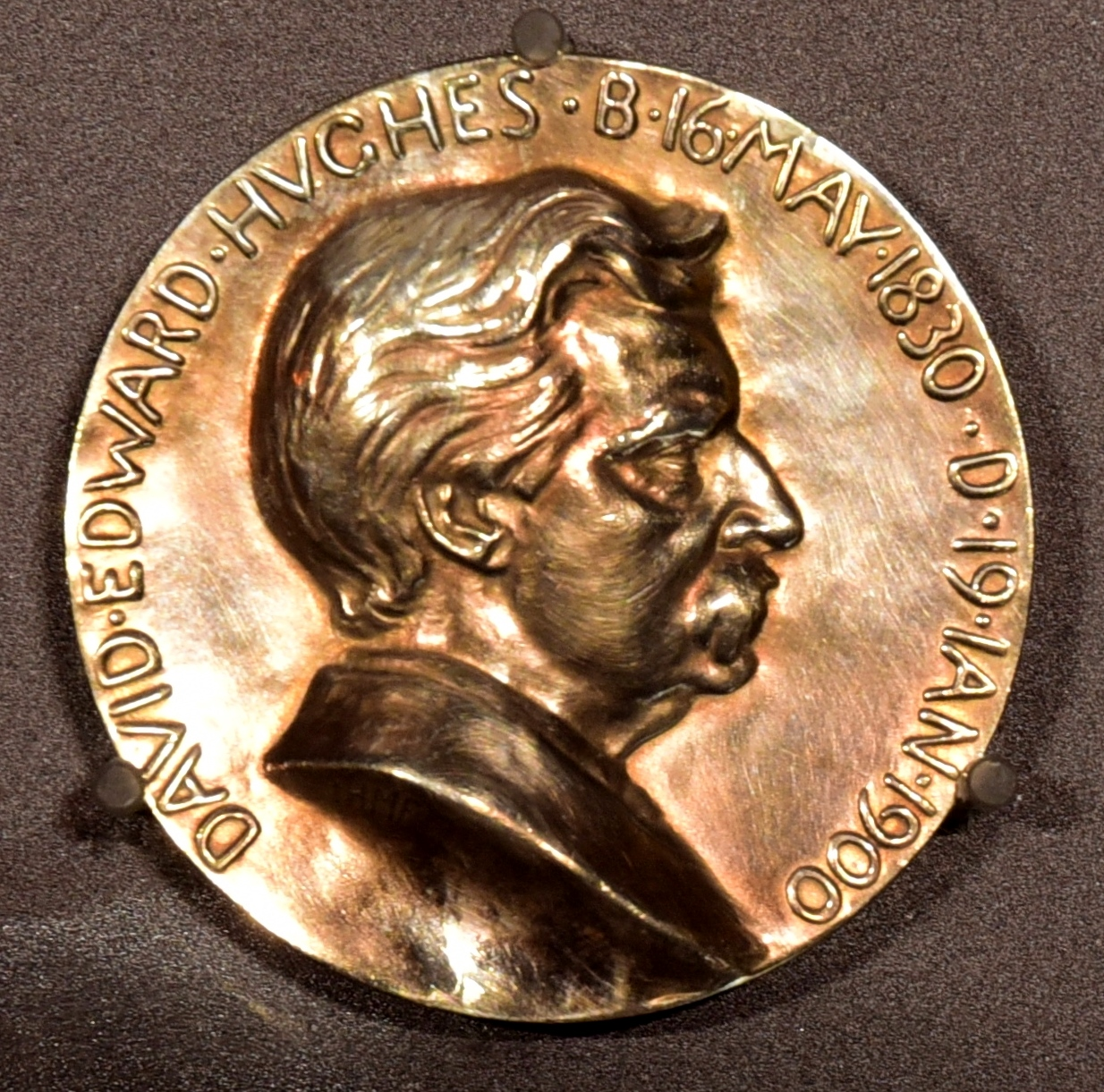
- Awarded for: "Outstanding contributions in the field of energy"
- Location: London, UK
- Presented by: Royal Society
- Reward: £2,000
- First award: 1902
- Website: royalsociety.org/awards/hughes-medal/

The Hughes Medal is awarded by the Royal Society "in recognition of an original discovery in the physical sciences, particularly electricity and magnetism or their applications." The medal is named after British–American scientist David E. Hughes. It was first awarded in 1902 to J. J. Thomson "for his numerous contributions to electric science, especially in reference to the phenomena of electric discharge in gases," and has since been awarded over one hundred times. Unlike other Royal Society medals, the Hughes Medal has never been awarded to the same individual more than once.

The award is given annually, and it consists of a silver-gilt medal and a cash prize of £2,000.

== Recipients ==
Year	Recipient		Citation	Ref.
Year	Image	Name	Citation	Ref.
1902		Joseph John Thomson	"For his numerous contributions to electric science, especially in reference to the phenomena of electric discharge in gases."	
1903		Johann Hittorf	"For his long continued experimental researches on the electric discharge in liquids and gases."	
1904		Joseph Swan	"For his invention of the incandescent lamp, and his other inventions and improvements in the practical applications of electricity."	
1905		Augusto Righi	"For his experimental researches in electrical science, including electric vibrations."	
1906		Hertha Ayrton	"For her experimental investigations on the electric arc, and also on sand ripples."	
1907		Ernest Howard Griffiths	"For his contributions to exact physical measurement."	
1908	Eugen Goldstein		"For his discoveries on the nature of electric discharge in rarefied gasses."	
1909	Richard Tetley Glazebrook		"For his researches on electrical standards."	
1910		John Ambrose Fleming	"For his researches in electricity and electrical measurements."	
1911		Charles Thomson Rees Wilson	"For his work on nuclei in dust-free air, and his work on ions in gases and atmospheric electricity."	
1912	William Duddell		"For his investigations in technical electricity."	
1913		Alexander Graham Bell	"For his share in the invention of the telephone, and more especially the construction of the telephone receiver."	
1914		John Sealy Edward Townsend	"For his researches on electric induction in gases."	
1915		Paul Langevin	"For his important contributions to, and pre-eminent position in, electrical science."	
1916		Elihu Thomson	"For his researches in experimental electricity."	
1917		Charles Glover Barkla	"For his researches in connexion with X-ray radiation."	
1918		Irving Langmuir	"For his researches in molecular physics."	
1919		Charles Chree	"For his researches in terrestrial magnetism."	
1920		Owen Willans Richardson	"For his work in experimental physics, and especially thermionics."	
1921		Niels Henrik David Bohr	"For his research in theoretical physics."	
1922		Francis William Aston	"For his discovery of isotopes of a large number of the elements by the method of positive rays."	
1923		Robert Andrews Millikan	"For his determination of the electronic charge and of other physical constants."	
1924	No award			
1925		Frank Edward Smith	"For his determination of fundamental electrical units and for researches in technical electricity."	
1926		Henry Jackson	"For his pioneer work in the scientific investigations of radiotelegraphy and its application to navigation."	
1927		William David Coolidge	"For his work on the X-rays and the development of highly efficient apparatus for their production."	
1928		Maurice de Broglie	"For his work on X-ray spectra."	
1929		Hans Geiger	"For his invention and development of methods of counting alpha and beta particles."	
1930		Venkata Raman	"For his studies on the abnormal scattering of light."	
1931		William Lawrence Bragg	"For his pioneer work on the elucidation of crystal structure by X-ray analysis."	
1932		James Chadwick	"For his researches on radioactivity."	
1933		Edward Victor Appleton	"For his researches into the effect of the Heaviside layer upon the transmission of wireless signals."	
1934		Karl Manne Georg Siegbahn	"For his work as a physicist and technician on long-wave X-rays."	
1935		Clinton Joseph Davisson	"For his research that resulted in the discovery of the physical existence of electron waves through long-continued investigations on the reflection of electrons from the crystal planes of nickel and other metals."	
1936		Walter Schottky	"For his discovery of the Schrot Effect in thermionic emission and his invention of the screen-grid tetrode and a superheterodyne method of receiving wireless signals."	
1937		Ernest Orlando Lawrence	"For his work on the development of the cyclotron and its application to investigations of nuclear disintegration."	
1938		John Douglas Cockcroft	"For their discovery that nuclei could be disintegrated by artificially produced bombarding particles."	
1938		Ernest Thomas Sinton Walton	"For their discovery that nuclei could be disintegrated by artificially produced bombarding particles."	
1939		George Paget Thomson	"For his important discoveries in connexion with the diffraction of electrons by matter."	
1940		Arthur Holly Compton	"For his discovery of the Compton Effect; and for his work on cosmic rays."	
1941	Nevill Francis Mott		"For his fertile application of the principles of quantum theory to many branches of physics, especially in the fields of nuclear and collision theory, in the theory of metals and in the theory of photographic emulsions."	
1942		Enrico Fermi	"For his outstanding contributions to the knowledge of the electrical structure of matter, his work in quantum theory, and his experimental studies of the neutron."	
1943		Marcus Laurence Elwin Oliphant	"For his distinguished work in nuclear physics and mastery of methods of generating and applying high potentials."	
1944	George Ingle Finch		"For his fundamental contributions to the study of the structure and properties of surfaces, and for his important work on the electrical ignition of gases."	
1945	Basil Ferdinand Jamieson Schonland		"For his work on atmospheric electricity and of other physical researches."	
1946	John Turton Randall		"For his distinguished researches into fluorescent materials and into the production of high frequency electro-magnetic radiation."	
1947		Jean Frédéric Joliot	"For his distinguished contributions to nuclear physics, particularly the discovery of artificial radioactivity and of neutron emission in the fission process."	
1948		Robert Watson-Watt	"For his distinguished contributions to atmospheric physics and to the development of radar."	
1949		Cecil Frank Powell	"For his distinguished work on the photography of particle tracks, and in connexion with the discovery of mesons and their transformation."	
1950		Max Born	"For his contributions to theoretical physics in general and to the development of quantum mechanics in particular."	
1951		Hendrik Anthony Kramers	"For his distinguished work on the quantum theory, particularly its application to the optical and magnetic properties of matter."	
1952	Philip Ivor Dee		"Particularly for his distinguished studies on the disintegration of atomic nuclei, particularly those using the Wilson cloud chamber technique."	
1953	Edward Bullard		"For his important contributions to the development, both theoretical and experimental, of the physics of the Earth."	
1954		Martin Ryle	"For his distinguished and original experimental researches in radio astronomy."	
1955	Harrie Stewart Wilson Massey		"For his distinguished contributions to atomic and molecular physics, particularly in regard to collisions involving the production and recombination of ions."	
1956	Frederick Lindemann		"For his distinguished work in many fields: the melting point formula and theory of specific heats; ionisation of stars; meteors and temperature inversion in the stratosphere."	
1957	Joseph Proudman		"For his distinguished work on dynamical oceanography."	
1958	Edward Neville da Costa Andrade		"For his distinguished contributions to many branches of classical physics."	
1959	Alfred Brian Pippard		"For his distinguished contributions in the field of low temperature physics."	
1960		Joseph Lade Pawsey	"For his distinguished contributions to radio astronomy both in the study of solar and of cosmic ray emission."	
1961	Alan Howard Cottrell		"For his distinguished work on the physical properties of metals, particularly in relation to mechanical deformation and to the effects of irradiation."	
1962	Brebis Bleaney		"For his distinguished studies of electrical and magnetic phenomena and their correlation with atomic and molecular properties."	
1963	Frederic Calland Williams		"For distinguished work on early computers."	
1964		Abdus Salam	"For his distinguished contributions to quantum mechanics and the theory of fundamental particles."	
1965	Denys Haigh Wilkinson		"For his distinguished experimental and theoretical investigation in nuclear structure and high energy physics."	
1966	Nicholas Kemmer		"For his numerous discoveries of major importance in theoretical nuclear physics which he has made."	
1967		Kurt Alfred Georg Mendelssohn	"For his distinguished contributions to cryophysics, especially his discoveries in superconductivity and superfluidity."	
1968		Freeman John Dyson	"For his distinguished fundamental work in theoretical physics, and especially on quantum electrodynamics."	
1969		Nicholas Kurti	"For his distinguished work in low-temperature physics and in thermodynamics."	
1970	David Robert Bates		"For his distinguished contributions to theoretical atomic and molecular physics and its applications to atmospheric physics, plasma physics and astrophysics."	
1971		Robert Hanbury Brown	"For his distinguished work in developing a new form of stellar interfrometer [sic], culminating in his observations of alpha virginis."	
1972		Brian David Josephson	"Particularly for his discovery of the remarkable properties of junctions between superconducting materials."	
1973	Peter Bernhard Hirsch		"For his distinguished contributions to the development of the electron microscope thin film technique for the study of crystal defects and its application to a very wide range of problems in materials science and metallurgy."	
1974	Peter Howard Fowler		"For his outstanding contributions to cosmic ray and elementary particle physics."	
1975	Richard Henry Dalitz		"For his distinguished contributions to the theory of the basic particles of matter."	
1976		Stephen William Hawking	"For his distinguished contributions to the application of general relativity to astrophysics, especially to the behaviour of highly condensed matter."	
1977		Antony Hewish	"For his outstanding contributions to radioastronomy, including the discovery and identification of pulsars."	
1978	William Cochran		"For his pioneering contributions to the science of X-ray crystallography, in which his work has made a profound impact on its development and application, and for his original contributions to lattice dynamics and its relation to phase transitions, which stimulated a new and fruitful field of results."	
1979	Robert Joseph Paton Williams		"For his distinguished studies of the conformations of computer molecules in solution by the use of nuclear magnetic resonance."	
1980		Francis James Macdonald Farley	"For his ultra-precise measurements of the muon magnetic moment, a severe test of quantum electrodynamics and of the nature of the muon."	
1981		Peter Ware Higgs	"For their international contributions about the spontaneous breaking of fundamental symmetries in elementary-particle theory."	
1981	Thomas Walter Bannerman Kibble		"For their international contributions about the spontaneous breaking of fundamental symmetries in elementary-particle theory."	
1982	Drummond Hoyle Matthews		"For their elucidation of the magnetic properties of the ocean floors which subsequently led to the plate tectonic hypothesis."	
1982	Frederick John Vine		"For their elucidation of the magnetic properties of the ocean floors which subsequently led to the plate tectonic hypothesis."	
1983	John Clive Ward		"For his highly influential and original contributions to quantum field theory, particularly the Ward identity and the Salam-Ward theory of weak interactions."	
1984		Roy Patrick Kerr	"For his distinguished work on relativity, especially for his discovery of the so-called Kerr Black Hole, which has been very influential."	
1985	Tony Hilton Royle Skyrme		"For his contributions to theoretical particle and nuclear physics, and his discovery that particle-like entities simulating the properties of baryons can occur in non-linear meson field theories."	
1986	M. M. Woolfson		"For the creation of algorithms including MULTAN and SAYTAN which are used world-wide to solve the majority of reported crystal structures."	
1987	Michael Pepper		"For his many important experimental investigations into the fundamental properties of semiconductors especially low-dimensional systems, where he has elucidated some of their unusual properties like electron localization and the Quantum Hall effects."	
1988		A. Howie	"For their contributions to the theory of electron diffraction and microscopy, and its application to the study of lattice defects in crystals."	
1988	M. J. Whelan		"For their contributions to the theory of electron diffraction and microscopy, and its application to the study of lattice defects in crystals."	
1989		John Stewart Bell	"For his outstanding contributions to our understanding of the structure and interpretation of quantum theory, in particular demonstrating the unique nature of its predictions."	
1990	Thomas George Cowling		"For his fundamental contributions to theoretical astrophysics including seminal theoretical studies of the role of electromagnetic induction in cosmic systems."	
1991		P. B. Moon	"For his contributions in three main areas of science - nuclear physics, the discovery of gamma-ray resonances, and the use of colliding molecular beams to study chemical reactions."	
1992	M. J. Seaton		"For his theoretical research in atomic physics and leadership of the Opacity Project."	
1993	G. R. Isaak		"For his pioneering use of resonant scattering techniques to make extremely precise measures of Doppler velocity shifts in the solar photosphere."	
1994	R. G. Chambers		"For his many contributions to solid-state physics, in particular his ingenious and technically demanding experiment which verified the Aharonov-Bohm effect concerning the behaviour of charged particles in magnetic fields."	
1995	D. Shoenberg		"For his work on the electronic structure of solids, in particular by exploiting low temperature techniques, particularly the De Haas Van Alphen effect, defining the Fermi surface of many metals."	
1996	A. D. Buckingham		"For his contributions to chemical physics, in particular to long-range intermolecular forces, non-linear optics, problems related to the polarizability of the helium atom, the interpretation of NMR spectra, and the applications of ab initio computations."	
1997	Andrew Richard Lang		"For his fundamental work on X-ray diffraction physics and for his developments of the techniques of X-ray topography, in particular in studying defects in crystal structures."	
1998	Raymond Hide		"For his distinguished experimental and theoretical investigations of the hydrodynamics of rotating fluids and the application of such basic studies to the understanding of motions in the atmosphere and interiors of the major planets."	
1999	Alexander Boksenberg		"For his landmark discoveries concerning the nature of active galactic nuclei, the physics of the intergalactic medium and of the interstellar gas in primordial galaxies."	
2000		Chintamani Nagesa Ramachandra Rao	"For his contributions to the field of materials chemistry, in particular, in relation to studies of the electronic and magnetic properties of transition metal oxides and high temperature superconductors."	
2001	John Bernard Pethica		"For his contributions to the field of nanometre and atomic scale mechanics. He invented and developed the technique of nanoindentation thereby revolutionising the mechanical characterisation of ultra-small volumes of materials."	
2002		Alexander Dalgarno	"For his contributions to the theory of atomic and molecular process, and in particular its application to astrophysics."	
2003	Peter Edwards		"For his distinguished work as a solid state chemist."	
2004		John Clarke	"For his outstanding research, leading the world in the invention, building and development of innovative new Superconducting QUantum Interference Devices (SQUID)."	
2005	Keith Moffatt		"For his contributions to the understanding of magnetohydrodynamics, especially to the mechanisms determining how magnetic fields can develop from a low background level to substantial amplitude."	
2006	Michael Kelly		"For his work in the fundamental physics of electron transport and the creation of practical electronic devices which can be deployed in advanced systems."	
2007		Artur Ekert	"For his pioneering work on quantum cryptography and his many important contributions to the theory of quantum computation and other branches of quantum physics."	
2008		Michele Dougherty	"For her innovative use of magnetic field data that led to discovery of an atmosphere around one of Saturn's moons and the way it revolutionised our view of the role of planetary moons in the Solar System."	
2009	No award			
2010		Andre Geim	"For his revolutionary discovery of graphene, and elucidation of its remarkable properties."	
2011	Matthew Rosseinsky		"For his influential discoveries in the synthetic chemistry of solid state electronic materials and novel microporous structures."	
2013	Henning Sirringhaus		"For his pioneering development of inkjet printing processes for organic semiconductor devices, and dramatic improvement of their functioning and efficiency."	
2014	No award			
2015	George Efstathiou		"For many outstanding contributions to our understanding of the early Universe, in particular his pioneering computer simulations, observations of galaxy clustering and studies of the fluctuations in the cosmic microwave background."	
2017		Peter Bruce	"For distinguished work elucidating the fundamental chemistry underpinning energy storage."	
2018		James Durrant	"For his distinguished photochemical studies for the design solar energy devices, particularly by transient spectroscopic studies of dye sensitized solar cells and of photoelectrochemical water splitting."	
2019		Andrew Cooper	"For the design and synthesis of new classes of organic materials with applications in energy storage, energy production and energy-efficient separations."	
2020		Clare Grey	"For her pioneering work on the development and application of new characterization methodology to develop fundamental insight into how batteries, supercapacitors and fuel cells operate."	
2021	John Irvine		"For the introduction of new concepts in Energy Materials science, including novel ionic conductors, electrodes for solid oxide fuel cells, alternative batteries and emergent nanomaterials."	
2022		Saiful Islam	"For outstanding contributions to the deeper understanding of atomistic processes in new materials for use in energy applications, especially those related to lithium batteries and perovskite solar cells."	
2023	Erwin Reisner		"For pioneering new concepts and solar technologies for the production of sustainable fuels and chemicals from carbon dioxide, biomass and plastic waste."	
2024	Linda Faye Nazar		"For her seminal contributions to the field of solid-state electrochemistry, and electrochemical energy storage."	

== See also ==
- List of physics awards
