= Microscopy and Microanalysis =

- Discipline: Microscopy
- Language: English
- Edited by: John Mansfield

Publication details
- History: 1995-present
- Publisher: Oxford University Press (2023-Present); Cambridge University Press (1995-2022)
- Frequency: Bimonthly
- Impact factor: 3.9 (2025)

Standard abbreviations
- ISO 4: Microsc. Microanal.

Indexing
- CODEN: MIMIF7
- ISSN: 1431-9276 (print); 1435-8115 (web)
- OCLC no.: 36919214

Links
- Journal homepage; Online access; Online archive

Microscopy and Microanalysis is a peer-reviewed scientific journal that covers original research in the fields of microscopy, imaging, and compositional analysis, including electron microscopy, fluorescence microscopy, atomic force microscopy, and live-cell imaging. It is published for the Microscopy Society of America.

It was established in February 1995, and was published by Cambridge University Press until Volume 29. All articles published until then first appeared online in The Cambridge Core section known as FirstView. From Volume 29 and onward, the journal was published by the Oxford University Press. According to the Journal Citation Reports, its 2019 impact factor is 3.414.
