= Nordic Microscopy Society =

- Abbreviation: SCANDEM
- Formation: 16 October 1948; 78 years ago
- Type: Professional Organisation and Registered Charity
- Members: 281 (2016)
- Secretary General: Varpu Marjomäki
- President: Kesara Anamthawat-Jónsson
- Vice President: Varpu Marjomäki
- Website: www.scandem.org
- Formerly called: Scandinavian Society for Electron Microscopy

The Nordic Microscopy Society (SCANDEM) is a learned society for the promotion of microscopy in the Nordic countries. It was founded on 16 October 1948 at the Research Institute of Experimental Physics in Stockholm, Sweden and was originally called the Scandinavian Society for Electron Microscopy (SCANDEM), reflecting the region of Europe the founding members of Denmark, Norway and Sweden are located. This name was in use until 2002 when it was changed to its current name to reflect the shift towards encompassing the broader field of microscopy. The society is a member of the European Microscopy Society committee of the International Federation of Societies for Microscopy.

== Presidents ==
Listed below are the presidents of the society from 1973 until present.

- Björn Afzelius (Sweden), 1973–1976.
- Arvid B. Maunsbach (Denmark), 1977–1980. President of the International Federation of Societies for Microscopy 1994–1997.
- Jorma Wartiovaara (Finland), 1981–1982.
- Bjørn V Johansen (Norway), 1983–1986.
- Sven-Olof Bohman (Sweden), 1987–1989.
- Kaarina Pihakaski-Maunsbach (Finland), 1990–1993.
- Anders Thölén (Sweden), 1994-?
- Kesara Anamthawat-Jónsson (Iceland), ?-present.
