= Rafal E. Dunin-Borkowski =

British experimental physicist

Rafal Dunin-Borkowski
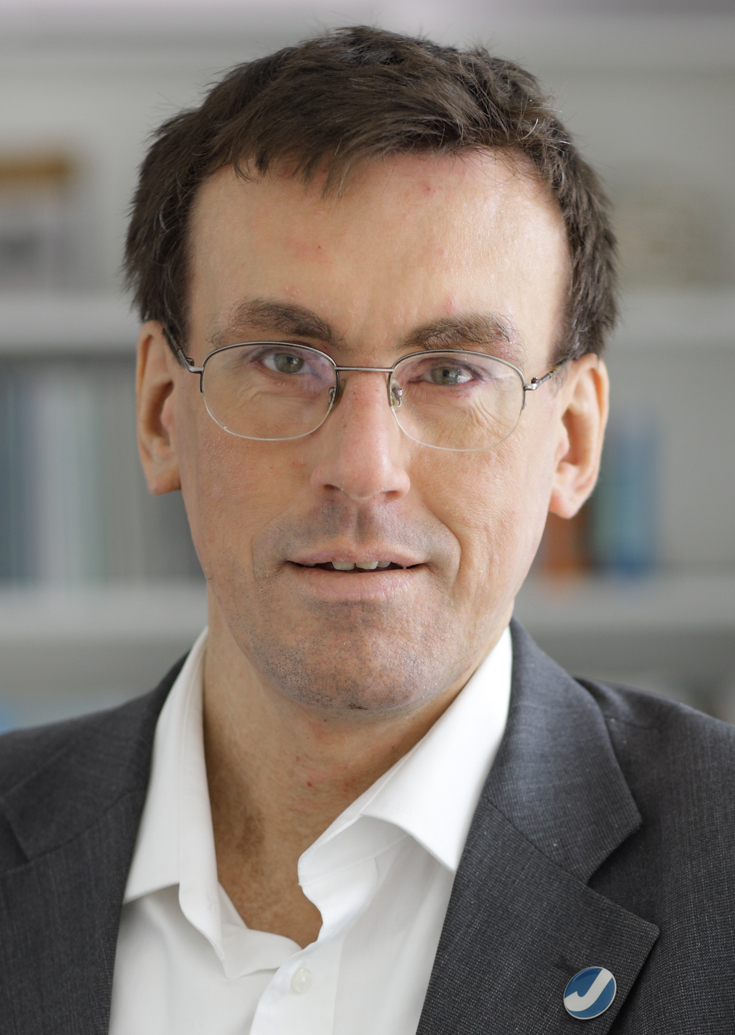
- Born: Rafal Edward Dunin-Borkowski; 3 August 1969 (age 57); London, United Kingdom
- Education: University of Cambridge (PhD)
- Scientific career
- Fields: Electron microscopy
- Workplaces: Forschungszentrum Jülich; RWTH Aachen University; Technical University of Denmark; University of Oxford; Arizona State University; University of Cambridge
- Thesis: Fresnel and high resolution techniques for the characterisation of ultrathin semiconductor layers (1994)
- Doctoral advisor: W M Stobbs
- Website: www.rafaldb.com

Rafal Edward Dunin-Borkowski HonFRMS (born 3 August 1969) is a British experimental physicist. He is currently co-director of the Ernst Ruska-Centre for Microscopy and Spectroscopy with Electrons (ER-C) in Forschungszentrum Jülich and professor of experimental physics in RWTH Aachen University.

== Education ==
Rafal Dunin-Borkowski was educated at the University of Cambridge where he was awarded a PhD in 1994 for research into semiconductors.

== Research ==
His research involves the development of quantitative techniques in electron microscopy and has recently focused on the use of off-axis electron holography to study magnetic and electrostatic fields in nanoscale materials, thin films and devices.

== Awards and honours ==
- Honorary Fellow of the Royal Microscopical Society 2023.
- European Research Council Synergy Grant 2019, jointly with S Blügel, M Kläui and T Rasing.
- Fellow of the Microscopy Society of America 2015.
- European Research Council Advanced Grant 2012.
- Ernst Ruska Prize 2009, jointly with M R McCartney and T Kasama.
- Royal Society University Research Fellowship 2000.
- Several awards for Science as Art.

== Family ==
- His maternal grandfather was Stefan Soboniewski.
- His paternal grandfather was Sławomir Dunin-Borkowski.
- His first cousin once removed was Marek Trombski.
