= Kesara Margrét Anamthawat-Jónsson =

Thai botanist at the University of Iceland

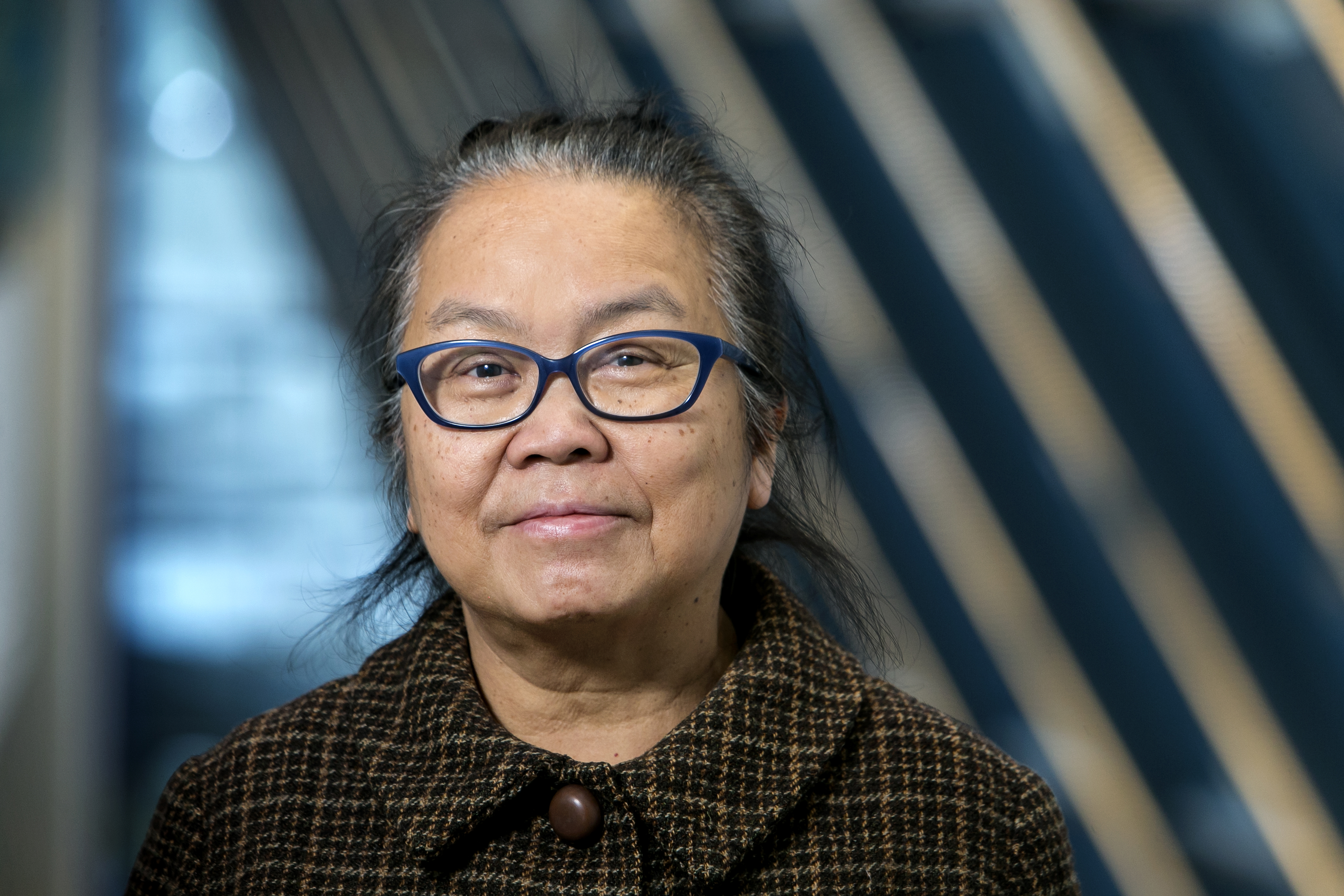
- Born: Bangkok, Thailand
- Occupation(s): Professor botany and plant genetics at the University of Iceland

Kesara Margrét Anamthawat-Jónsson FRMS (publication name: Kesara Anamthawat-Jónsson) is a Thai-Icelandic botanist. She is a professor of botany and plant genetics at the Faculty of Life and Environmental Sciences, School of Engineering and Natural Sciences, University of Iceland.

== Education ==
Kesara was awarded an entry to the Faculty of Science, Chulalongkorn University. She completed the four-years programme in 1974, with a B.Sc. (Hons.) degree, Botany major, and during the graduation ceremony she received the Gold Medal Award from King Bhumibol Adulyadej Rama IX.

In 1976 Kesara received a Fulbright grant from the US Embassy in Thailand for graduate study at the College of Liberal Arts and Sciences, University of Kansas. She studied botany with emphases on plant cytogenetics, systematics and evolution. She defended her Master's thesis and graduated with an MA degree in 1979.

In 1988, after having worked for several years as a researcher in Iceland, Kesara began her PhD studies on plant cytology and genetics at the School of Biological Sciences, University of Cambridge, Churchill College. Kesara received financial support for her PhD studies from the British Embassy in Reykjavík (the Chevening Scholarship), and the Overseas Fellowship from the UK Government. She also received an allowance as research assistant from BP Venture Research Programme. Kesara defended her thesis and graduated with a PhD in 1992.

== Academic and research career ==
Kesara began her academic career as a lecturer at the Department of Botany, Faculty of Sciences, Chulalongkorn University (1973 – 1976), and later from 1979, after completing her Master's studies in the US, as assistant professor in the same department until she moved to Iceland in 1981. The courses she taught included General Botany, Plant Physiology and Cytogenetics. Upon her departure from Thailand, Kesara was honoured with The Most Exalted Order of the White Elephant, Companion (Fourth Class) (จัตุรถาภรณ์ช้างเผือก), in appreciation of her academic service to the country.

Her career in Iceland began in January 1982 at the Agricultural Research Institute in Keldnaholt in Reykjavik (now part of the Agricultural University of Iceland, until 1988 when she went to UK for her PhD studies. During her time at the institute, she established chromosome techniques for studying birch trees and various other Icelandic plant species. Kesara also received training abroad on two occasions: on plant chromosome preparation methods at the University of Helsinki and animal cytogenetics at the School of Veterinary Science, University of Guelph. After Kesara completed her PhD in UK, she came back to work as a research scientist at this institute (1992 – 1996), focussing on the genetics of birch trees, while initiating her own study of lyme grass in Iceland.

In 1996, Kesara received an appointment as lecturer at the Department of Biology, University of Iceland. She was appointed associate professor in 1997 and Professor from 1 January 1999. She has taught undergraduate and graduate courses, including Diversity of Life, Plant Physiology, Plant Genetics and Biotechnology, Cytogenetics and Tropical Biology. Kesara has been a graduate supervisor to twelve Master's and PhD students at the University of Iceland and from universities in Finland, Sweden and Thailand. Eight Master's PhD students are still working on their research projects under her supervision.

== Genetic history of birch woodland in Iceland (1982 – present) ==
The main focus of Kesara's research since she began her career in Iceland 37 years ago has been the genetics of Icelandic plants. She has made numerous discoveries in this field, the results of active collaboration with her students and colleagues in Iceland and abroad. Studying the genetics of Icelandic tree-birch or woodland birch species (Betula pubescens) particularly interests Kesara. This birch often has a shrub-like form, and her studies have shown that this is mostly due to introgressive hybridization with the co-existing dwarf birch species (Betula nana). Gene flow between the two species, via hybridization, is thought to have an evolutionary advantage, especially for species survival in the changing environment. Molecular genetic studies have confirmed this introgressive hybridization and have also indicated the multiple origin of Icelandic birch. The studies of subfossil pollen from lake sediments have detected birch hybridization throughout the Holocene. The climate warming, e.g., during the Holocene Thermal Maximum, was found to coincide with peaks of hybridization between the two birch species in Iceland. Kesara has also studied other tree species, including aspen, rowan and willow.

== Cereal nuclei and chromosome painting in plants (1988 – 1995) ==
The first project in her PhD research was to use light- and electron microscopy to further support the model of higher order of nuclear organization in plants. After that, Kesara became directly involved in the development of a new molecular cytogenetic technique, called Genomic In Situ Hybridization (GISH). The method instantly proved applicable to detecting chromosome transfers in cereal cultivars and differentiating parental genomes in hybrids.

== Triticeae genomes – from barley to lyme grass (1989 – present) ==
Kesara has been studying genomic and evolutionary relationships among some species of the wheat tribe Triticeae. For barley, she used molecular cytogenetic techniques to map retroelements on chromosomes. She has collaborated with and supervised a number of PhD students in the genomic identification of several perennial Triticeae species. As for Icelandic lyme grass (Leymus arenarius), Kesara has studied the molecular genetic diversity of this species, traced the genomic origin and has identified the genome composition of this genus.

== Triteymus – new cereal hybrid, new bread (1992 – present) ==
Kesara has been developing a new cereal hybrid, namely “Triteymus” (Triticoleymus), which is derived from crosses between wheat (Triticum) and lyme grass (Leymus). Triteymus should be suitable for cultivation in Iceland. The triteymus genome contains variable combinations of wheat and lyme grass chromosomes. Kesara has been testing eight different triteymus lines, and some of them are early heading, which should be good for a short summer season like Iceland's.

== Chromosome techniques for clinical and research cytogenetics in Iceland (1993 – 1998) ==
Kesara introduced the techniques of Fluorescence In Situ Hybridization (FISH) to Iceland. Firstly, the techniques were adopted for use in clinical cytogenetics, whereby whole-chromosome painting and gene localization were used to detect chromosome aberrations and disease-causing mutations. Secondly, FISH was used in breast cancer research, for example, to detect genome instability related to BRCA2 and p53 mutations.

== Genetics of plant colonization on the volcanic island Surtsey (2010 – present) ==
Since 2010, Kesara has supervised, at the volcanic island Surtsey, molecular genetic analyses of plants colonizing by means of sea-borne dispersal, including lyme grass (Leymus) and sea sandwort (Honckenya), and plants that reached the island via bird-facilitated seed dispersal, such as fescue (Festuca) and crowberry (Empetrum). The results indicated multiple origins, rapid expansion and differentiation although the island is still very young.

== Promoting microscopy for Iceland and the Nordic region (2007 – present) ==
Kesara has used fluorescence and electron microscopy in her studies of plant genetics. Recently she has collaborated with researchers in other fields, such as ecology and archaeology, when it comes to using electron microscopy as a tool for imaging the microstructure of biological samples. She wrote a news report about the discovery of super-resolution optical microscopy.

Kesara joined the Nordic Microscopy Society (SCANDEM) in 2007, the year when Iceland became a member of the society, and since 2014, she has served as president and chairman of the board. Kesara, with the help of many colleagues, organized the annual SCANDEM conference in Iceland twice, in 2009 and 2017, both times hosted by the University of Iceland. Kesara has also joined the UK's Royal Microscopical Society, served one 3-year term on the RMS Council, and in January 2019 she was elected FRMS fellow of the society.

== Teaching and research collaboration with Thailand (2003 – present) ==
For the last twenty years, Kesara has been nurturing connection and collaboration with Thailand, with Chulalongkorn University and Mahidol University. She has given lectures and seminars and taught in workshops on cytogenetics. She has co-supervised a number of PhD research projects on Thai plants, including forest trees, as well as medicinal and aromatic herbs.
