= Hans Busch =

German physicist

Hans Walter Hugo Busch (27 February 1884 in Jüchen, North Rhine-Westphalia, Germany – 16 February 1973 in Darmstadt, Hesse) was a German physicist. He was a pioneer of electron optics and laid the theoretical basis for the electron microscope.

From 1904 to 1905 he studied physics in Strasbourg, from 1905 to 1908 in Berlin and from 1907 to 1911 physics and applied physics in Göttingen. He then was assistant for applied electrical engineering in Göttingen. He received his doctorate in 1911 from the University of Göttingen. In 1920 he habilitated from the same university and was then Privatdozent of physics and applied physics. In 1921 he was Privatdozent in Jena. In 1922 he became associate professor in Jena. In 1929 he became professor at the Technische Hochschule (TH) in Charlottenburg (now Technische Universität Berlin). In 1930 he became Professor in Electrical Engineering at the TH Darmstadt (now Technische Universität Darmstadt) and from 1933 to 1934 the rector of the university. From 1937 to 1939 and 1944 to 1947 he was the Dean of the Department of Electrical Engineering of the TH Darmstadt. Busch became a Patron Member of the SS. In 1940 Busch and his team started to work on data transmission in Peenemünde Army Research Center. For this work he received the War Merit Cross in 1942. From 1944 to 1945 he was at the same time Dean of the Department of Mechanical Engineering. In 1952 he became professor emeritus.

Ernst Ruska read a paper by Busch in the academic journal Archives Elektrotechnik where Busch suggested that magnetic fields could be used to direct beams of electrons analogous to the way light is refracted by optical lenses. His proof that a small angle electron beam can be focused to a point by a cylindrical magnetic lens was the basis for the development of the transmission electron microscope by Ruska and Knoll.

In recognition of his work in the field, Busch was unanimously elected an honorary fellow of the German Society for Electron Microscopy at its first meeting in 1949.
