= Eva Olsson (scientist) =

Swedish physicist

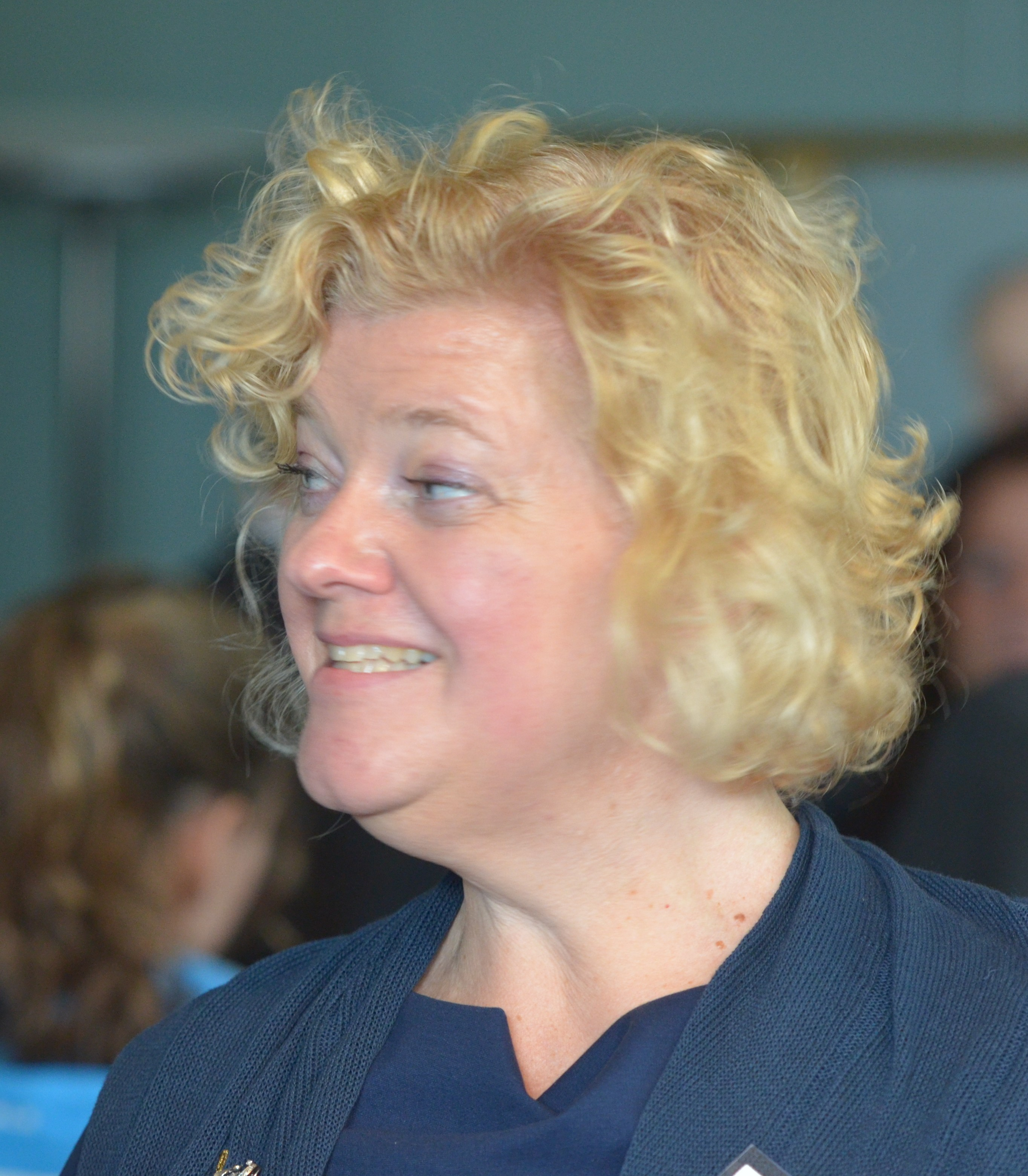
- Olsson in 2012
- Born: 12 October 1960 (age 65)
- Education: Chalmers University of Technology
- Scientific career
- Workplaces: Uppsala University; Chalmers University of Technology; IBM
- Thesis: Interfacial microstructure in ZnO varistor materials (1988)
- Website: Eva Olsson Group

Eva Olsson (born 12 October 1960) is a Swedish physicist who is a professor at Chalmers University of Technology. She is a member of the Royal Swedish Academy of Sciences and part of the selection committee for the Nobel Prize in Physics.

== Early life and education ==
Olsson was an undergraduate student in Gothenburg at the Chalmers University of Technology, where she specialised in engineering physics. She worked on mirror furnaces for her undergraduate diploma. After graduating, she remained at Chalmers and started a doctoral research project studying the interfacial structures of zinc oxide varistor materials. She moved to the United States as a researcher with David R. Clarke at IBM. She returned to the Chalmers University of Technology in 1991, where she was eventually awarded her docent degree.

== Research and career ==
Olsson was appointed associate professor at Chalmers in 1996. She was appointed professor at Uppsala University a year later, where she worked for four years before returning to Chalmers as a full professor. At Chalmers, Olsson has served as Director of Material Analysis, Head of Microscopy and Head of Applied Physics.

Olsson develops novel characterisation techniques for materials. She is mainly interested in materials for emerging technologies, including catalysis, photovoltaic and quantum devices. In particular, Olsson works with electron microscopy. In 2013, Olsson was awarded SEK 33 million from the Knut and Alice Wallenberg Foundation, with which she developed soft microscopy. Soft microscopy involves developing ways to use electron microscopes to study soft and semi-hard materials, creating new avenues for advances in material science.

When characterising gold using an electron microscope at the highest level of magnification, it was discovered that they could force gold to melt at room temperature. The initial discovery was made by Ludvig de Knoop who was a researcher in her group. He noticed that the surface of gold lost its bonds under the bombardment with electrons within an electron microscope. Knoop and Olsson were among those who wrote the paper for the journal Physical Review Materials in 2018. Olsson could see applications of this phenomenon for sensors and transistors. In 2018, she was awarded a further SEK 25 million to study plasmon-exciton coupling.

Olsson is a member of the Nobel Prize in Physics Selection Committee. When men won all of the science Nobel prizes in 2021, Olsson said "We want to have more women nominated".

== Selected publications ==
- T Klaus; R Joerger; Eva Olsson; C G Granqvist (1 November 1999). "Silver-based crystalline nanoparticles, microbially fabricated". Proceedings of the National Academy of Sciences of the United States of America. 96 (24): 13611–13614. Bibcode:1999PNAS...9613611K. doi:10.1073/pnas.96.24.13611. ISSN 0027-8424. PMC 24112. PMID 10570120. Wikidata Q33881022.
- Klaus-Joerger T; Joerger R; Olsson E; Granqvist C (1 January 2001). "Bacteria as workers in the living factory: metal-accumulating bacteria and their potential for materials science". Trends in Biotechnology. 19 (1): 15–20. doi:10.1016/s0167-7799(00)01514-6. ISSN 0167-7799. PMID 11146098. Wikidata Q34123240.
- Alexey Kalabukhov; Robert Gunnarsson; Johan Börjesson; Eva Olsson; Tord Claeson; Dag Winkler (19 March 2007). "Effect of oxygen vacancies in the SrTiO 3 substrate on the electrical properties of the LaAlO 3 ∕ SrTiO 3 interface". Physical Review B. 75 (12). arXiv:cond-mat/0603501. doi:10.1103/physrevb.75.121404. ISSN 0163-1829. Wikidata Q27339745.
