= Thomas Fleming Bergin =

Irish railway official and inventor

- Died: December 1862; Dublin
- Occupation: Civil engineer

Thomas Fleming Bergin (died 1862) was an Irish civil engineer and early Irish railway official. He was the company clerk of the Dublin and Kingstown Railway (D&KR), the first public railway in Ireland. He was responsible for the design of the Bergin Patent Spring Buffer, the buffering system that it used.

== Biography ==
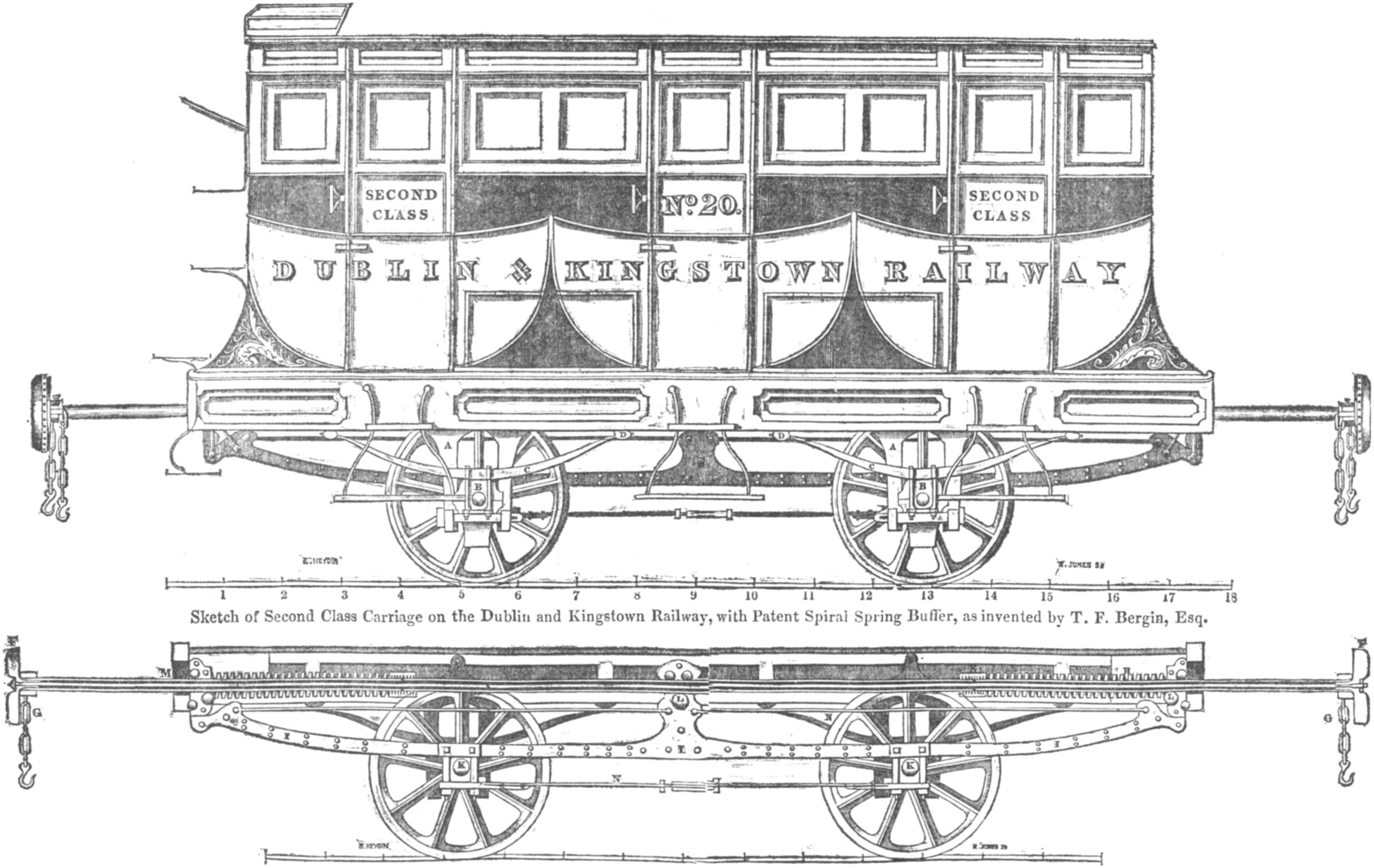
Dublin Penny Journal 1835-12-26 Dublin & Kingstown Railway Second Class Carriage by E. Heyden

Bergin, who was by profession a civil engineer, joined the Dublin and Kingstown Railway (D&KR) in 1832, replacing James Pim as company secretary. Lyons notes Pim and Bergin as "two of the most valuable engines the D&KR possessed, although other individuals also played an important part." Murray notes Bergin had a "large part of the daily management of the railway", and also notes that Bergin and Pim made an excellent team. Bergin was to remain loyal to the D&KR despite offers from other railways.

Thomas notes the D&KR 'chief clerk' (aka Bergin (Note: Thomas actually uses the term Chief Clerk but as Lyons notes that as Bergin styles himself Clerk of the Company Bergin is the only reasonable candidate here.)) was sent to the Liverpool and Manchester Railway (L&MR) (Note: The Liverpool and Manchester Railway was in the 1830s the first, and perhaps for a few years only, example of a significant and effective railway with both freight and scheduled passenger operations; additionally it was a relatively short distance from Dublin by steam packet) in June 1833. Dawson notes Bergin observed the sprung buffer/connection system used on the L&MR and determined to develop his own design for the D&KR.

On 16 December 1834 Bergin placed advertisements in the Dublin newspapers as 'clerk of the company' proclaiming the public opening of the D&KR with an hourly service from 9am to 4pm inclusive from Westland-Row to Blackrock and Kingstown.

Bergin was additionally appointed 'mechanical engineer' in 1835, though as that position was found to be needing a full time appointment Bergin was to revert to 'clerk'. Bergin retired when the operation of the D&KR was taken over by the Dublin and Wicklow Railway in 1856.

Bergin served as president of the Microscopical Society of Ireland in 1842. He died in December 1862.
