= David W. Piston =

American physicist

- Education: Grinnell College (BA); University of Illinois at Urbana–Champaign (MS, PhD)
- Known for: Pancreatic beta cell and alpha cell research; advanced microscopy
- Scientific career
- Fields: Physics; Cell biology; Physiology
- Workplaces: Vanderbilt University; Washington University School of Medicine
- Thesis: (1989)

David W. Piston is an American physicist. He is the Edward Mallinckrodt, Jr. Professor and Head of Cell Biology and Physiology at Washington University School of Medicine.

== Education ==
Piston completed a bachelor of arts in physics at Grinnell College in 1984. In 1986, he completed a master of science in physics at University of Illinois at Urbana–Champaign. He earned his doctor of philosophy in physics from the same institution in 1989. He was a postdoctoral researcher in the lab of Watt W. Webb at Cornell University from 1989 to 1992.

== Career ==
In 1992, Piston joined the faculty of Vanderbilt University where his laboratory worked on pancreatic beta cells and then later alpha cells. In 2010, he became president of the Microscopy Society of America. In 2015, he was recruited to Washington University in St. Louis to serve as head of the department of cell biology and physiology.
