= M. Grace Burke =

American materials scientist

- Education: University of Pittsburgh; Imperial College London
- Scientific career
- Workplaces: U.S. Steel Research Laboratory; Westinghouse Science & Technology Center; Bettis Atomic Power Laboratory; University of Manchester; Oak Ridge National Laboratory

Mary Grace Burke is an American materials scientist who is an emeritus professor at the University of Manchester. She was awarded the 2020 International Metallographic Society Henry Clifton Sorby Award and was the 2019-2023 President of the Royal Microscopical Society.

== Early life and education ==
Burke was raised in Pittsburgh. She remained in Pittsburgh for undergraduate studies, during which she specialized in metallurgical engineering at the University of Pittsburgh. Burke attended Imperial College London, where she did her PhD research on stress corrosion cracking (SCC). Working under the supervision of P. R. Swann and F. J. Humphreys, Burke studied the mechanism of SCC of austenitic stainless steel. Burke was interested in the relationship between materials behavior and microstructure.

== Research and career ==
After earning her doctorate, Burke returned to the United States, where she worked at the U.S. Steel Research Laboratory in Monroeville, Pennsylvania. She studied thermomechanical processing effects on microstructural evolution in steels, using analytical transmission electron microscopy. She also performed correlative TEM analyses in combination with atom probe field ion microscopy (APFIM).

Burke also studies irradiation embrittlement of the steels and alloys used in light water reactor systems. She joined the Westinghouse Science and Technology Center, where she studied a broad range materials and alloys for nuclear power systems. She transferred to the Bettis Atomic Power Laboratory, where she studied how microstructure impacted the performance of materials.

Burke joined the University of Manchester in England as a Professor of Materials Performance and Director of the Materials Performance Centre in 2011.

== Awards and honors ==
- 1995 Elected Fellow of ASM International
- 2005 President of the Microscopy Society of America
- 2015 Elected Fellow of the Institute of Materials, Minerals and Mining
- 2018 MicroAnalysis Society President's Award
- 2018 Elected Fellow of The Microanalysis Society
- 2019 Elected President of the Royal Microscopical Society
- 2019 Elected Fellow of The Metals, Materials and Minerals Society (TMS)
- 2020 International Metallographic Society Henry Clifton Sorby Award
- 2021 Henri Coriou Award
