= Martha R. McCartney =

American physicist

Martha Rogers "Molly" McCartney is an American physicist known for her work developing electron holography and using it to measure electromagnetic fields at the nanoscale. She is a professor emerita at Arizona State University.

== Education ==
McCartney has a 1982 bachelor's degree from Evergreen State College in Olympia, Washington. She went to Arizona State University for doctoral study, completing her Ph.D. in 1989. Her dissertation, Observations of electron irradiation effects at transition metal oxide surfaces, was supervised by David J. Smith.

== Recognition ==
In 2009, McCartney and her coauthors Rafal E. Dunin-Borkowski and Takeshi Kasama were the recipients of the Ernst Ruska Prize of the German Society for Electron Microscopy.

McCartney was elected as a Fellow of the American Physical Society (APS) in 2012, after a nomination from the APS Division of Materials Physics, "for outstanding contributions to the development of off-axis electron holography and applications to the quantification of nanoscale electrostatic and magnetic fields".
