= David J. Smith (physicist) =

American physicist

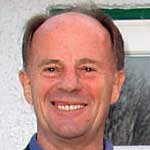
- Born: 1948 (age 77–78)
- Education: University of Melbourne
- Known for: High-resolution transmission electron microscopy
- Awards: Boys Medal and Prize (1985)
- Scientific career
- Fields: Physics
- Workplaces: Arizona State University; University of Cambridge

David J. Smith is a Regents' Professor of physics at Arizona State University. He is an Australian experimental physicist and his research is focussed on using the electron microscope to study the microstructure of different materials. He is a pioneer in high-resolution electron microscopy technique and is very well known in his field. His interests are focused on thin films, nanostructures, novel materials and magnetism.

== Research areas ==
His basic research centers around the development of quantitative High Resolution Transmission Electron Microscopy, aided by computer-controlled microscope operation and image simulation, which enables direct determination of atomic structure in defective materials. His research also involves using electron-microscopy-based methods to characterize advanced materials such as semiconductor heterostructures, magnetic thin films and multilayers, and nanostructures. Semiconductor systems of interest include ternary and quaternary Group III nitride alloys for light-emitting diodes and lasers, and II–VI alloys, such as mercury cadmium telluride for detectors of infra-red radiation. Magnetic materials being studied include shape-memory alloys, as well as magnetic tunnel junctions, which are based on ferromagnet-insulator-ferromagnet combinations, that have promising applications for non-volatile, high-storage-density recording media. Off-axis electron holography is a particularly powerful approach since it permits quantitative visualization of nanoscale electric and magnetic fields, and we are using the technique to investigate the magnetization behavior and fringing fields associated with patterned nanostructures.

== Achievements ==
- 2019 Harald Rose Distinguished Lectureship – German Microscopy Society
- 2014 Helmholtz International Fellow Award
- 2014 Distinguished Physical Scientist Award – Microscopy Society of America
- 2013 Elected Fellow – Microscopy Society of America
- 2010 Elected Fellow – Materials Research Society
- 2003 Highly Cited in Materials Science – ISI Thomson Scientific
- 2009 President – Microscopy Society of America
- 2002 Elected Fellow – American Physical Society
- 2000 Regents' Professorship – Arizona State University
- 1990 Faculty Achievement Award – Burlington Resources Foundation
- 1989 Distinguished Teaching Award – Arizona State University, College of Liberal Arts and Sciences
- 1986 Frontiers of Chemistry Lectureship – Case Western Reserve University
- 1985 Charles Vernon Boys Prize – Institute of Physics (UK)
- 1981 Elected Fellow Institute of Physics (UK)
- Listed American Men and Women of Science (Bowker)

== Selected publications ==
=== Alone ===
- "The realization of atomic resolution with the electron microscope", Reports Progress Phys. 60, 1513–1580 (1997). doi:10.1088/0034-4885/60/12/002
- "Progress and perspectives for atomic-resolution electron microscopy", Ultramicroscopy 108, 159–166 (2008). doi:10.1016/j.ultramic.2007.08.015
- "Development of aberration-corrected electron microscopy", Microsc. Microanal. 14, 2–15 (2008). doi:10.1017/S1431927608080124
- "Ultimate resolution in the electron microscope?", Materials Today 11 (Supp), 30–38 (2008). doi:10.1016/S1369-7021(09)70005-7

=== Collaborations ===
- McCartney, M.R., Dunin-Borkowski, R.E., Scheinfein, M.R., Smith, D.J., Gider, S. and Parkin, S.S., "Origin of magnetization decay in spin-independent tunnel junctions", Science 286, 1337–1340 (1999). doi:10.1126/science.286.5443.1337
- Floyd, M., Zhang, Y., Drucker, J., Smith, D.J., Tari, S. and Sivananthan, S. "Evolution of self-assembled Ge/Si (211) islands", Appl. Phys. Lett. 79, 4518–4520 (2001). doi:10.1063/1.1428772
- McCartney, M.R. and Smith, D.J., "Electron holography: phase imaging with nanometer resolution", Annu. Rev. Mater. Res. 37, 729–767 (2007). doi:10.1146/annurev.matsci.37.052506.084219
