= Deborah F. Kelly =

American biomedical engineer

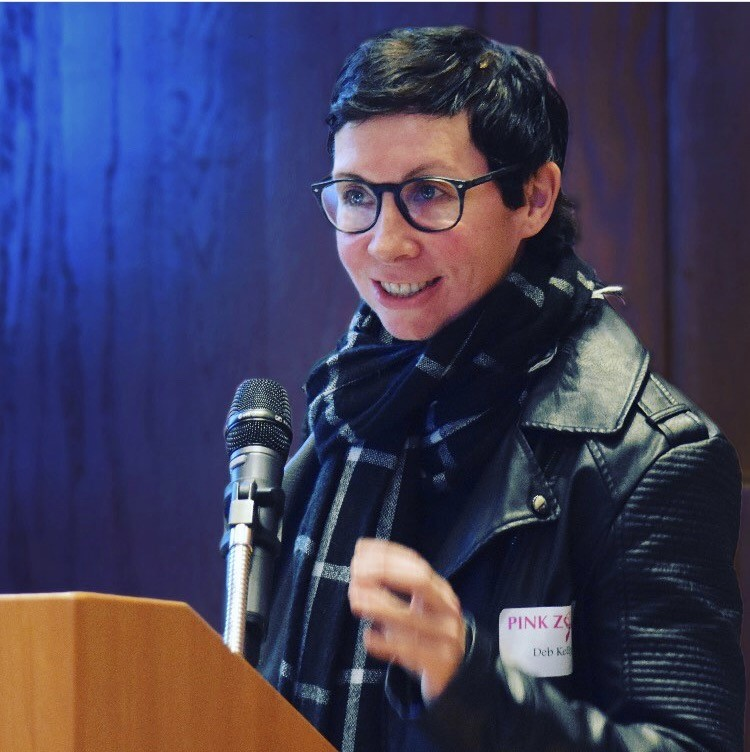
- Education: Florida State University
- Scientific career
- Workplaces: Virginia Tech; Harvard Medical School; Pennsylvania State University
- Website: deb-kelly-lab.com

Deborah F. Kelly is an American biomedical engineer who is a former professor at Pennsylvania State University. Her research makes use of cryogenic electron microscopy to better understand human development and disease. She was elected President of the Microscopy Society of America in 2022.

Some of her papers have been retracted, and Pennsylvania State University barred her from conducting research for the institution due to what its investigation determined were data integrity problems in her work.

== Early life and education ==
Kelly attended Florida State University for graduate research. She moved to the Harvard Medical School for her postdoctoral research.

== Research and career ==
In 2010, Kelly joined the Virginia Tech School of Medicine as an assistant professor, and was promoted to associate professor in 2017. She moved to Pennsylvania State University as Director of the Center for Structural Oncology in 2019. In 2022, she became president of the Microscopy Society of America.

Kelly combines structural and functional characterization tools to understand cellular communication. Amongst these, she has considered protein receptors. On the surfaces of cells, these receptors transmit information about cellular microenvironment to cellular nuclei. These signals can cause genes to turn off and on. Cancer cells can thrive when genes are activated inappropriately during cell division. These cancerous cells can evade conventional forms of treatment and are understood to result in the formation of malignant tumors. By determining the three-dimensional structure of these protein complexes Kelly hopes to design new therapeutic interventions.

Kelly makes use of cryogenic electron microscopy to visualize these cellular interactions. Specifically, she has developed a platform ('affinity capture') that can isolate the cells which cause metastasis. Kelly developed a microchip toolkit to identify mutations in BRCA1. These microchips, which she called cryo-chips, use silicon nitride to quickly identify, isolate and tether protein assemblies. When the COVID-19 pandemic started, Kelly shifted her focus to the SARS-CoV-2 virus. However, one study by Kelly and colleagues, studying the N protein of SARS-CoV-2 and using the group's chip technology, was later retracted by Nanoscale due to several technical problems and questions.

Kelly has also reported methods which propose to determine protein structures in the liquid phase (Liquid-EM), as opposed to the standard frozen state of Cryogenic electron microscopy. However, the validity of this method and the reported results have been questioned by others in the field. Four of her papers have been retracted, she has been banned from research activities at Pennsylvania State University (following an investigation by the university that found "serious data integrity concerns"), and her work continues to be scrutinized.
