= Francis Farley =

British physicist

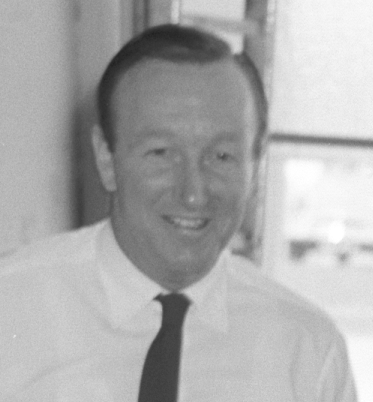
- Portrait of Francis Farley taken in his laboratory at CERN, Geneva, 1960.
- Born: 13 October 1920; Lucknow (India)
- Died: 16 July 2018; Southern France, Grasse
- Education: University of Cambridge
- Employers: CERN (1957–); University of Auckland (1950–1957)
- Notable work: Muon g-2

Francis James Macdonald Farley FRS (13 October 1920 –16 July 2018) was a British physicist. He was elected Fellow of the Royal Society on 16 March 1972 earning the designation FRS. He was also a Fellow of the Institute of Physics and an honorary fellow of Trinity College Dublin. He was educated at Clifton College and at Clare College, Cambridge. Farley obtained his PhD from Cambridge in 1950.

During World War II, he designed and made the first X-band microwave radar with 100 ns pulse and a one degree beam which directed the 15" guns at Dover. It showed shells splashing around the target. He invented clutter reference Doppler radar which could see vehicles on land and was used in Italy. As a senior lecturer in Auckland University he was a NZ delegate to the 1955 UN conference in Geneva on "Peaceful Uses of Atomic Energy". During a year at Harwell in 1955, he measured the neutron yield from plutonium fission as a function of the incident neutron epithermal energy.

From 1957 at CERN, he devised and measured the muon g-2 value, the anomalous magnetic moment of the muon, in three successive experiments, inventing the muon storage ring, as well as performing other accurate tests of special relativity at CERN (muon lifetime) and more. Known to his reading audience on many of his publications as Farley, he participated in a leading role as one of the only experimental physicists from the CERN experiments in residence full-time at and with the follow-up fourth measurement of muon g-2 at Brookhaven National Laboratory (the other being Frank Krienen who joined CERN with Amsterdam Prof & third Director General C J Bakker in 1954); Farley continued to provide equally leading guidance for the follow-up fifth muon g-2 measurement at Fermilab (FNAL) which began data taking around the time of his death.

The physics legacy of Farley by his muon g-2 experiment conducted by hundreds of physicists, engineers, and national laboratory staff, established the muon as a spin-1/2 particle, satisfying the Dirac equation, quantum electrodynamics (CERN I & II), hadron physics (CERN III), electroweak, and Higgs physics (BNL IV), in each of their respective eras. All of these experimental determinations were monumental for the progress of particle physics theory, enabling the most recent and actively current FNAL V experiment to significantly constrain the introduction of new particles by theory advances, such as supersymmetry and dark matter.

He started working on wave energy in 1976 and filed 14 patents in this area. He was the co-inventor of the Anaconda wave energy device.

He won the 1980 Hughes Medal of the Royal Society "for his ultra-precise measurements of the muon magnetic moment, a severe test of quantum electrodynamics and of the nature of the muon".

1967–82 he was the academic head of the Royal Military College of Science, Shrivenham. He has been a visiting professor at Yale, University of Reading, University of New South Wales and at Southampton.

Moving to France in 1986 he helped the cancer hospital Centre Antoine Lacassagne in Nice to install a 65 MeV cyclotron for proton therapy. He designed the beam transport which brings the beam to the patient. Operating unmodified for 23 years the system has treated over 3000 patients for ocular melanoma with a cure rate of 95%.

== Publications ==
His publications include the Methuen monograph "Elements of Pulse Circuits" (1955) translated into French and Spanish and papers on particle physics, relativity, wave energy and cosmology.

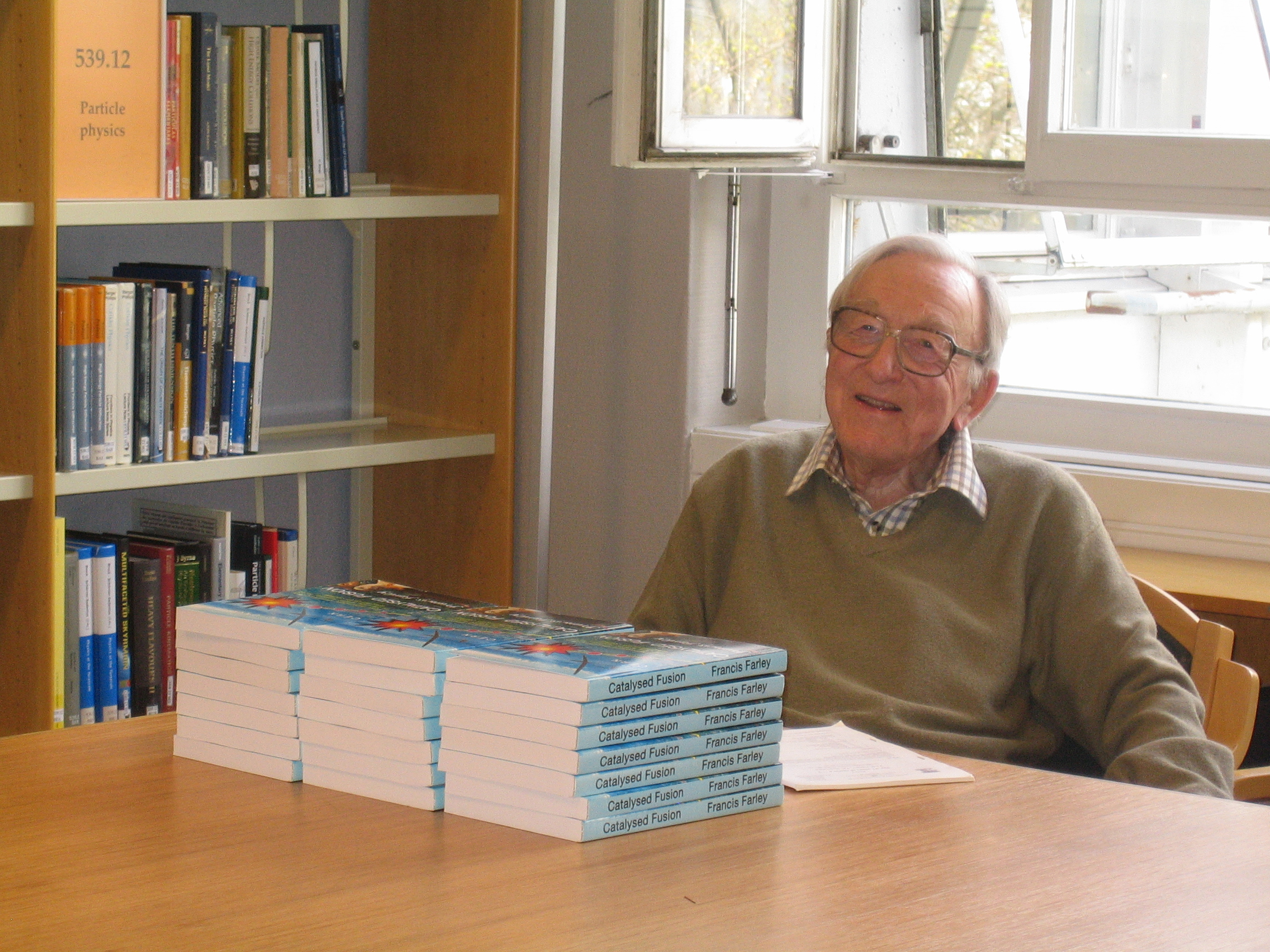
Francis Farley presenting his novel "Catalysed Fusion" in the CERN Library.

In 2012, he wrote a romantic novel, Catalysed Fusion, which illustrates life around the accelerators at CERN and in Geneva

Farley signed more than 50 peer reviewed articles. His nuclear and particle physics related publications are indexed in INSPIRE-HEP

The European Patent Office has registered 17 patents with Francis Farley as the inventor.
