= David Cockayne =

British physicist (1942–2010)

- Born: David John Hugh Cockayne; 19 March 1942; Balham, United Kingdom
- Died: 22 December 2010 (aged 68); Oxford, United Kingdom
- Resting place: Oxford, United Kingdom
- Education: University of Melbourne (MSc); University of Oxford (DPhil)
- Known for: work on quantum dots; weak beam technique; work on C70 fullerene
- Spouse: Jean Kerr
- Children: Sophie, Tamsin and James
- Awards: See list
- Scientific career
- Fields: Materials Science
- Thesis: Electron microscope images of defects in crystal lattices (1970)

David John Hugh Cockayne FRS FInstP (19 March 1942 – 22 December 2010) was Professor in the physical examination of materials in the Department of Materials at the University of Oxford and professorial fellow at Linacre College from 2000 to 2009. He was the president of the International Federation of Societies for Microscopy from 2003 till 2007, then vice-president 2007 to 2010.

Cockayne was an electron microscopist who played an important role in the development of weak-beam transmission electron microscopy (TEM), and in the application of high resolution TEM to diamond, fullerenes and semiconductors.

== Biography ==
Cockayne was born in Balham, London, the second of three children of John Henry Cockayne, policeman and later staff manager, and his wife, Ivy, née Hatton. In 1950, when he was 8, the family sailed from Tilbury on the Otranto, bound for Melbourne; their new home was to be in the Geelong area of Victoria. In 1952 they moved to a newly-built house in Geelong, and Cockayne attended a new school, from where he was awarded a scholarship to Geelong Grammar School in 1953, where he excelled in chemistry, physics and mathematics.

In 1961 Cockayne enrolled at the University of Melbourne to read physics; he graduated in 1964 with first-class honours. He went on to do research on electron diffraction for an MSc, again gaining a first in 1966. He was then awarded a Commonwealth Scholarship to read for a DPhil at Magdalen College, Oxford.

David joined the Department of Metallurgy in Oxford in September 1966 to conduct research on electron microscope images of defects in crystal lattices, under the supervision of Dr M J Whelan. He was awarded a DPhil in 1970.

At the age of 32, Cockayne took up the post of director of the University of Sydney Electron Microscope Unit (EMU) in June 1974. He also held the position of associate professor. He was promoted to full professor in 1986, and then to a personal chair (Professor in Physics (Electron Microscopy and Microanalysis)) in 1992. He built up an important research base at Sydney; with David McKenzie he developed a high-precision electron diffraction technique within an electron microscope to study the structure of amorphous materials.

Cockrayne moved back to Oxford in 2000, to take up the post of Professor in the Physical Examination of Materials, at the Department of Materials. He also became Professorial Fellow at Linacre College. In the department of materials he “built up an outstanding electron microscopy group”, and followed up studies started in Sydney on the properties of nanometer-sized crystals (quantum dots) insemiconductor alloys.

=== The man and his family ===
“Cockayne was an inspirational lecturer and mentor. He cared deeply about research, teaching, and university administration, and brought lucidity and commitment in equal measure to all three.” […] His interests included “theatre, music, literature, photography, travel, and bushwalking”. When he was an undergraduate at Trinity College, Melbourne University he met Jean Kerr, who enrolled a year after Cockrayne and was reading French and English honours. She was resident in the next-door hall, and they got to know each other early in 1962 and became close friends in 1964 Shortly before he left for Oxford in September 1966, he proposed to Jean and they announced their engagement. She travelled to England in January 1967, and they were married in Shilton, Oxfordshire on 28 July 1967. The couple had three children: Sophie was born in Oxford in 1973; Tamsin in Sydney in 1975; and James in Sydney in 1977.

David Cockayne died from lung cancer on 22 December 2010. He was cremated in Oxford following a funeral service at the University Church of St Mary the Virgin on 5 January 2011. He wrote his own eulogy to give himself 'the pleasure of knowing what will have been said at my funeral'.

== Honours and distinctions ==
- 1985–87 Vice-President, Australian Institute of Science and Technology
- 1986–88 Foundation President, Australian Society for Electron Microscopy
- 1986–94 Chairman, National Committee for Electron Microscopy, Australian Academy of Science
- 1999 Fellow of the Royal Society
- 2000–09 Professorial Fellow of Linacre College, University of Oxford
- 2000–09 Honorary professor, School of Physics, University of Sydney
- 2002–06 President, International Federation of Societies for Microscopy
- 2003–08 Honorary research associate, Australian Key Centre for Microscopy and Microanalysis, University of Sydney
- 2005–10 Honorary professor, University of Science and Technology Beijing
- 2006–07 Honorary professor, Lanzhou University of Technology
- 2007–10 Vice-President, International Federation of Societies for Microscopy
- 2009 Massey Medal of UK and Australian Institute of Physics

When Cockayne was elected a Fellow of the Royal Society (FRS) in 1999 his certificate of election noted that he was:

Distinguished for his contributions to the development of electron microscopy and its applications to Materials Science. He developed the theory, and with Ray the experimental procedures for the "weak beam" technique, which improved by an order of magnitude, to 1.5nm, the resolution at which complex lattice defect geometries could be studied. The technique has led to important advances in understanding of the structure and properties of defects, and is now a routine tool. Cockayne's papers in this field are classic. He applied the technique inter alia to measure accurate values of stacking fault energies, demonstrated unambiguously for the first time that dislocations in semiconductors are dissociated, whether stationary or gliding, and elucidated the structure and positions of misfit dislocations in strained layer superlattices. He has made important contributions to the interpretation of lattice fringes. Following earlier work by Grigson, with McKenzie he developed a powerful electron diffraction technique for determining radial distribution functions from small areas of amorphous materials, collecting only elastically scattered electrons, transforming the method into a precision tool giving nearest neighbour distances accurate to 0.01A. Applications include the demonstration of the existence of the amorphous form of tetrahedrally coordinated carbon, and the refinement of models for C60 and C70. Cockayne's work is remarkable for his deep physical insight, and his ability to apply this insight to the development of powerful and widely applicable techniques.
