= Microscopy Society of Ireland =

Irish scientific foundation/society

- Founded: 1975
- Type: Professional Organisation and Registered Charity
- Origins: Irish Society For Electron Microscopy
- Region served: Ireland
- Members: 117
- Key people: President: Dr Kerry Thompson
- Website: www.microscopy.ie

The Microscopy Society of Ireland (MSI) is a learned society for the promotion of microscopy in Ireland. It was founded in 1975 as the Irish Society For Electron Microscopy and held its first symposium the following year at University College Dublin, an event they have held every year since 1979. It shares the Journal of Microscopy with the Royal Microscopical Society as its official journal. The society is the member organisation of the European Microscopy Society representing the island of Ireland.

== Earlier societies ==
There existed previously a Microscopical Society of Dublin formed in November 1840. Irish civil engineer Thomas Fleming Bergin was the president of this society 1842.
