= Mirror furnace =

In a mirror furnace, material is heated by the lamps whose radiation is focused by mirrors. They are widely used for growing single crystals for scientific purposes, using the "floating zone" method.

== See also ==
- Solar furnace
