= Michael Whelan (scientist) =

British scientist (born 1931)

Michael Whelan HonFRMS FRS FInstP
- Born: 2 November 1931
- Died: 30 November 2024 (aged 93)
- Alma mater: Gonville and Caius College
- Awards: Hughes Medal; Gjønnes Medal in Electron Crystallography
- Website: www.materials.ox.ac.uk/peoplepages/whelan.html
- Academic career
- Institutions: University of Cambridge; University of Oxford
- Doctoral advisor: Peter Hirsch

Michael John Whelan HonFRMS FRS FInstP (2 November 1931 – 30 November 2024) was a British scientist.

== Education and career ==
Whelan completed his PhD at Gonville and Caius College, Cambridge under the supervision of Peter Hirsch. He held research posts at the University of Cambridge until 1966 when he moved to the University of Oxford. As of 2011, Whelan was Emeritus Professor in the Department of Materials at the University of Oxford, England, and an Emeritus Fellow of Linacre College, Oxford.

== Awards ==
In 1976 he was elected as Fellow of the Royal Society and Fellow of the Institute of Physics. He and Archibald Howie won the 1988 Hughes Medal of the Royal Society "for their contributions to the theory of electron diffraction and microscopy, and its application to the study of lattice defects in crystals". He also received the 1998 Distinguished Scientist Award in Physical Sciences from the Microscopy Society of America and the 1965 C.V. Boys Prize from the Institute of Physics. In 2001 he was elected honorary fellow of the Royal Microscopical Society. In 2011 he won the Gjønnes Medal in Electron Crystallography.

== Publications ==
- Peng, L.-M.; Dudarev, S. L.; Whelan, M. J. (2004), High-energy electron diffraction and microscopy, Monographs on the physics and chemistry of materials, vol. 61, Oxford University Press, ISBN 978-0-19-850074-2

== Sources ==
- Michael J. Whelan's homepage at Oxford University
- Prof M J Whelan, FRS Authorised Biography – Debrett's People of Today
