= Peter Hirsch (metallurgist) =

British metallurgist (1925–2025)

Sir Peter Hirsch FRS HonFRMS
- Born: 16 January 1925; Berlin, Brandenburg, Prussia, Germany
- Died: 12 September 2025 (aged 100)
- Education: St Catharine's College, Cambridge (B.A., 1946; PhD., 1951)
- Known for: Transmission Electron Microscopy; Physics
- Relatives: Afua Hirsch (great-niece)
- Awards: Franklin J. Clamer Medal (1970); Hughes Medal (1973); Royal Medal (1977); Wolf Prize in Physics (1983/4); Holweck Meda (1988); Lomonosov Gold Medal (2005); Fellow of the Royal Society
- Scientific career
- Fields: Materials science
- Workplaces: University of Cambridge; University of Oxford
- Thesis: An X-ray micro-beam technique (1951)
- Doctoral advisor: W. H. Taylor
- Doctoral students: Michael J. Whelan

Sir Peter Bernhard Hirsch FRS HonFRMS (16 January 1925 – 12 September 2025) was a British metallurgist who made fundamental contributions to the application of transmission electron microscopy to metals.

== Life and career ==
Hirsch was born in Berlin on 16 January 1925; his parents divorced in 1934 and his father died two years later. Hirsch lived in Germany until 1939; he was one of hundreds of Jewish children that escaped Germany via the various Kindertransport missions that saved many such children from the impending dangers of World War II and the Holocaust.

Hirsch attended Sloane Grammar School, Chelsea, and St Catharine's College, Cambridge. In 1946 he joined the Crystallography Department of the Cavendish to work for a PhD on work hardening in metals under W. H. Taylor and Lawrence Bragg. His doctoral research was funded by grants from the British Iron and Steel Research Association, the Department of Scientific and Industrial Research, and a junior research studentship from St Catharine's College. He subsequently carried out work, which is still cited, on the structure of coal, funded by the National Coal Board and a University of Cambridge research fellowship.

In the mid-1950s, he pioneered the application of transmission electron microscopy (TEM) to metals and developed in detail the theory needed to interpret such images. He was a Fellow of Christ's College, Cambridge from 1960 to 1966 and was elected an Honorary Fellow of Christ's in 1978. In 1965, with Howie, Whelan, Pashley and Nicholson, he published the text Electron microscopy of thin crystals. The following year he moved to Oxford to take up the Isaac Wolfson Chair in Metallurgy, succeeding William Hume-Rothery, and was elected a Fellow of St Edmund Hall, Oxford. He held this chair until his retirement in 1992, building up the Department of Metallurgy (now the Department of Materials) into a world-renowned centre. Among many other honours, he was awarded the 1983 Wolf Foundation Prize in physics. He was elected to the Royal Society in 1963 and knighted in 1975.

Hirsch was elected a member of the National Academy of Engineering in 2001 for experimentally establishing the role of dislocations in plastic flow and of electron microscopy as a tool for materials research. His great-niece is the writer and broadcaster Afua Hirsch.

In March 2025, the University of Oxford department of materials held a symposium in honour of Hirsch, to mark his 100th birthday. Hirsch died after a brief illness on 12 September 2025, at the age of 100.
