= Robert Glaeser =

Robert Martin Glaeser
- Born: July 20, 1937 (age 89); Kenosha, Wisconsin, U.S.
- Education: University of California, Berkeley; University of Wisconsin – Madison
- Known for: development of cryo-EM
- Scientific career
- Workplaces: University of California, Berkeley; Lawrence Berkeley National Laboratory
- Website: http://mcb.berkeley.edu/faculty/all/glaeserr

Robert Martin Glaeser (born July 20, 1937) is an American biochemist. He is a professor emeritus of Biochemistry, Biophysics and Structural Biology at the University of California, Berkeley and a faculty scientist at Lawrence Berkeley National Laboratory, in Berkeley, California, US. His main research area is electron diffraction and membrane models.

Glaeser is known for his pioneering work in cryogenic electron microscopy (cryo-EM), where he established how radiation damage was a limiting factor for imaging resolution and how freezing hydrated specimens allowed for more tolerance to radiation damage. He also pushed electron imaging microscopy resolution and contrast by studying the effect of beam-induced movement on the resolution and developed methods for weak-phase imaging.

Glaeser studied at the University of Wisconsin – Madison (B.A. 1959) and the University of California, Berkeley (Ph.D. 1964). He was then a postdoc at the University of Oxford (1963/64) and University of Chicago (1964/65). In 1988/89 he was a visiting scientist at the Max Planck Institute for Biochemistry (MPIB) in Martinsried near Munich, and later a professor at the University of California, Berkeley.

== Awards ==
- 1983: Guggenheim Fellowship of the John Simon Guggenheim Memorial Foundation.
- 1986, President of the Electron Microscope Society of America.
- 2016: member of the American Academy of Arts and Sciences and the National Academy of Sciences
- 2018: Glenn T. Seaborg Medal
- 2021: Lawrence Berkeley National Laboratory Lifetime Achievement award
