= Bodo von Borries =

German physicist

Bodo von Borries (born 22 May 1905, died 17 July 1956) in Aachen, North Rhine-Westphalia) was a German physicist. He worked with Ernst Ruska in the 1930s to build the first practical electron microscopes.

Von Borries studied electrical engineering at the Technische Hochschule in Danzig (today Gdańsk University of Technology), and at Berlin (today Technische Universität Berlin), where he was awarded a PhD in 1932. Von Borries worked at RWE from 1934 to 1937. In 1937, he commenced work on electron microscopy with Ernst Ruska at Siemens & Halske AG in Berlin. Also in 1937, Von Borries would marry Hedwig Ruska, Ernst Ruska's sister.

After World War II, he founded the "Rhine-Westphalia Institute for Electron Microscopy" in Düsseldorf in 1948. In 1949, he was involved in the foundation of the German Society for Electron Microscopy.

In 1953, he became a full professor at the Technical University of Aachen and established its Department of Electron Optics and Precision Engineering, where he worked until his sudden death in 1956.
