= Christian Colliex =

French physicist

The French physicist Christian Colliex (b. 1944) is known for his pioneering work on the use of electron energy loss spectroscopy (EELS) in transmission electron microscopy.

Born in 1944, Colliex graduated from the École Nationale Supérieure des Mines de Paris in 1965 and received his Ph.D. in Solid State Physics in 1970 from the CNRS Laboratoire de physique des solides, Orsay. He is now CNRS Research Director at the Solid State Physics laboratory in Orsay, head of the Electron Microscopy group. From 2007 to 2010 he served as President of the International Federation of the Societies for Microscopy (IFSM). He won the 2008 Fernand Holweck Medal and Prize.

== See also ==
- Fernand Holweck Medal and Prize
