= Microscopy Society of America =

- Abbreviation: MSA
- Established: November 1942; 84 years ago
- Founder: G. L. Clark
- Founded at: Chicago, Illinois
- Type: Nonprofit
- Registration no.: 11-6042333
- Legal status: Research institute
- Purpose: Provides microanalytical facilities for studies within the sciences
- Location: Wakefield, Massachusetts, United States
- Coordinates: 42.5239°N 71.0413°W
- Region served: Worldwide
- President: Grant Jensen
- Main organ: Committee
- Affiliations: American Institute of Physics
- R.O.R. Id: 02vdmpp49
- Revenue: $2.64 million ▲ (2023)
- Expenses: $2.36 million (2023)
- Website: www.microscopy.org
- Formerly called: Electron Microscope Society of America

The Microscopy Society of America (MSA), founded in 1942 as The Electron Microscope Society of America, is a non-profit organization that provides microanalytical facilities for studies within the sciences. Currently, there are approximately 3000 members. The society holds an annual meeting, which is usually held in the beginning of August. It has 30 local affiliates across the United States. The society has a program for examining and certifying technologists of electron microscopes. The organization produces two journals: Microscopy Today, and Microscopy and Microanalysis. As of 2025, the President is Grant Jensen.

== History ==
A meeting of electron microscopists took place in November 1942 at the Sherman House Hotel in Chicago. It was organized by G. L. Clark of the University of Chicago. At this meeting the society was founded as the Electron Microscope Society of America (EMSA). For the 1949 meeting, the EMSA invited representatives from European microscopy societies, which may have been a catalyzing event for the creation of an international microscopy society: the International Federation of Societies for Electron Microscopy (IFSEM), which the EMSA later joined, and would eventually hold joint meetings with IFSEM; the first of these joint meetings would the 9th International Congress of Electron Microscopy in 1978.

The name of the society was changed in 1964 to the Electron Microscopy Society of America to "reflect the cross-discipline nature of microscopy applications." In 1993, the name was changed to the current one: the Microscopy Society of America to "reflect the increasing diversity of microscopy and microanalysis techniques and their applications represented at the annual Microscopy and Microanalysis (M&M) meeting and in MSA publications."

== Structure ==
The MSA has an MSA Executive Council made up of five individuals: the president, president-elect, past president, treasurer and secretary. Those elected president serve three-year terms, where they have different roles during each year. During the first year they act as the president-elect, during the second year they act as the president, and during the final year they act as the past president. The treasurer serves a five-year term, and the secretary serves a two-year term.

Additionally, there is an MSA Council made up of seven individuals each elected to two-year terms.

== Publications ==
Microscopy Today and Microscopy and Microanalysis both release six times a year alternating with each other. The former is released in odd months (January, March etc.), while the latter is released in even months (February, April etc.). Both are now published by Oxford University Press, but were published by the Cambridge University Press prior to 2023.

=== Microscopy Today ===
Microscopy Today is a trade magazine intended to provide information to microscopists working in all fields, with coverage including light microscopy, microanalytical methods and electron microscopy. The current editor-in-chief is Dr. Robert L. Price.

It was published by Cambridge University Press until Volume 31, where publishing was taken over by Oxford University Press.

=== Microscopy and Microanalysis ===
Microscopy and Microanalysis is a peer-reviewed scientific journal that covers original research in the fields of microscopy, imaging, and compositional analysis, including electron microscopy, fluorescence microscopy, atomic force microscopy, and live-cell imaging.

It was established in February 1995, and was published by Cambridge University Press until Volume 29. All articles published until then first appeared online in The Cambridge Core section known as FirstView. From Volume 29 and onward, the journal was published by the Oxford University Press. According to the Journal Citation Reports, its 2019 impact factor is 3.414.

== Microscopy Listserver ==

The Microscopy Listserver is a network based discussion forum giving members of the scientific community a centralized Internet address to which questions/comments/answers in the various fields of Microscopy or Microanalysis can be rapidly distributed to a list of (subscribed) individuals by electronic mail. There are in excess of 3000 subscribers to the Microscopy Listserver from over 40 countries on 6 continents, who participate in this system on a daily basis. Messages are posted and circulated daily on a variety of topics. The Listserver was founded by Nestor J. Zaluzec who continues to host and operate the service for the scientific community, the Listserver is co-sponsored in part by the Microscopy Society of America.

This Listserver has been in operation since 1993 and maintains a searchable archive of all posted Email questions, comments, and responses. Every two months, selected contributions on the Microscopy Listserver are published in the archives of Microscopy-Today

For the purposes of this forum, Microscopy or Microanalysis is considered to include all techniques which employ a probe such as: photons (including x-rays), electrons, ions, mechanical and/or electromagnetic radiation to form a representation or characterization of the microstructure (internal or external) of any material in either physical and/or life sciences applications.

Some of the more common techniques which are associated with this field include the following:

- optical microscopy
- x-ray microscopy
- scanning electron microscopy
- transmission electron microscopy
- atomic force microscopy
- scanning tunneling microscopy
- scanning ion microscopy
- analytical electron microscopy
- high resolution electron microscopy*
- intermediate/high voltage electron microscopy
- electron microprobe analyzers
- x-ray energy dispersive spectroscopy
- electron energy loss spectroscopy
- .......

There are no charges for usage of the forum, except for the request that one actively participates in any discussion to which you have a question, comment and/or contribution.

Unsolicited commercial advertising messages are prohibited, however, brief announcements of educational/training courses are permitted on a strictly limited basis.

In compliance with US Public Law 108-187 (CANSPAM Act) only subscribers and/or posters receive copies of posting to the Listserver via Email. Non-subscribers are allowed to browse the archives.

== Notable people ==
- Thomas F. Anderson, biophysical chemist and geneticist; elected President of the Electron Microscope Society of America in 1955.
- M. Grace Burke, materials scientist; elected President of Microscopy Society of America in 2005.
- C. Barry Carter, professor of material science; elected President of Microscopy Society of America in 1997.
- Thomas Eugene Everhart, educator and physicist; elected President of the Electron Microscopy Society of America in 1977.
- Robert Glaeser, biochemist; elected President of the Electron Microscopy Society of America in 1986.
- Ernest Lenard Hall, university professor; elected President of Microscopy Society of America in 2013.
- David Harker, medical researcher; elected President of the Electron Microscope Society of America in 1946.
- Étienne de Harven, pathologist and electron microscopist; elected President of the Electron Microscopy Society of America in 1976.
- James Hillier, scientist and inventor who commercialized the first electron microscope with Albert Prebus; elected President of the Electron Microscope Society of America in 1945.
- Deborah F. Kelly (living), biomedical engineer and university professor; elected President of the Microscopy Society of America in 2022.
- Michael A. O'Keefe, physicist; elected President of Microscopy Society of America in 2007.
- David W. Piston, physicist; elected President of Microscopy Society of America in 2010.
- Keith R. Porter, cell biologist; elected President of the Electron Microscope Society of America in 1962 and 1990.
- David J. Smith, experimental physicist; elected President of Microscopy Society of America in 2009.
- Robley C. Williams, biophysicist and virologist; elected President of the Electron Microscope Society of America in 1951.
- Ralph Walter Graystone Wyckoff, chemist and pioneer of X-ray crystallography; elected President of the Electron Microscope Society of America in 1950.
- Nestor J. Zaluzec, scientist and inventor; elected President of Microscopy Society of America in 2011.
