= German Society for Electron Microscopy =

German learned society

The German Society for Electron Microscopy (Deutsche Gesellschaft für Elektronenmikroskopie, abbreviated DGE) is a learned society founded in 1949 in Düsseldorf, Germany. Ernst Brüche suggested that an association dedicated to electron microscopy be formed to coordinate German work. In the immediate post-World War II period, there were three German centers of research on electron microscopes: in Berlin under Ernst Ruska, in Mosbach under Brüche, and in Düsseldorf under Bodo von Borries.

The first president of the DGE was Ruska, and its first committee members were Hans Mahl, Fritz Jung, Walter Kikuth and Otto Scherzer and von Borries.

Hans Busch was elected an honorary member at the Society's first meeting.

In 2016, the society had 396 members.
