= Timeline of microscope technology =

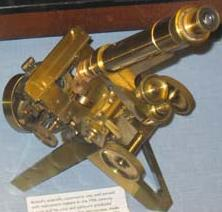
1852 microscope

Timeline of microscope technology

- c. 700 BC: The "Nimrud lens" of Assyrian manufacture, a rock crystal disk with a convex shape believed to be a burning or magnifying lens.
- 13th century: The increase in use of lenses in eyeglasses probably led to the wide spread use of simple microscopes (single lens magnifying glasses) with limited magnification.
- 1590: earliest date of a claimed Hans Martens/Zacharias Janssen invention of the compound microscope (claim made in 1655).
- After 1609: Galileo Galilei is described as being able to close focus his telescope to view small objects close up and/or looking through the wrong end in reverse to magnify small objects. A telescope used in this fashion is the same as a compound microscope but historians debate whether Galileo was magnifying small objects or viewing nearby objects with his terrestrial telescope (convex objective/concave eyepiece) reversed.
- 1619: Earliest recorded description of a compound microscope, Dutch Ambassador Willem Boreel sees one in London in the possession of Dutch inventor Cornelis Drebbel, an instrument about eighteen inches long, two inches in diameter, and supported on three brass dolphins.
- 1621: Cornelis Drebbel presents, in London, a compound microscope with a convex objective and a convex eyepiece (a "Keplerian" microscope).
- c.1622: Drebbel presents his invention in Rome.
- 1624: Galileo improves on a compound microscope he sees in Rome and presents his occhiolino to Prince Federico Cesi, founder of the Accademia dei Lincei (in English, The Linceans).
- 1625: Francesco Stelluti and Federico Cesi publish Apiarium, the first account of observations using a compound microscope
- 1625: Giovanni Faber of Bamberg (1574–1629) of the Linceans, after seeing Galileo's occhiolino, coins the word microscope by analogy with telescope.
- 1655: In an investigation by Willem Boreel, Dutch spectacle-maker Johannes Zachariassen claims his father, Zacharias Janssen, invented the compound microscope in 1590. Zachariassen's claimed dates are so early it is sometimes assumed, for the claim to be true, that his grandfather, Hans Martens, must have invented it. Findings are published by writer Pierre Borel. Discrepancies in Boreel's investigation and Zachariassen's testimony (including misrepresenting his date of birth and role in the invention) has led some historians to consider this claim dubious.
- 1661: Marcello Malpighi observed capillary structures in frog lungs.
- 1665: Robert Hooke publishes Micrographia, a collection of biological drawings. He coins the word cell for the structures he discovers in cork bark.
- 1674: Antonie van Leeuwenhoek improves on a simple microscope for viewing biological specimens, Infusoria (protists in modern zoological classification) (see Van Leeuwenhoek's microscopes).
- 1725: Edmund Culpeper develops the double tripod compound microscope, which is widely adopted.
- 1825: Joseph Jackson Lister develops combined lenses that cancelled spherical and chromatic aberration.
- 1846: Carl Zeiss founded Carl Zeiss AG, to mass-produce microscopes and other optical instruments.
- 1850s: John Leonard Riddell, Professor of Chemistry at Tulane University, invents the first practical binocular microscope.
- 1863: Henry Clifton Sorby develops a metallurgical microscope to observe structure of meteorites.
- 1860s: Ernst Abbe, a colleague of Carl Zeiss, discovers the Abbe sine condition, a breakthrough in microscope design, which until then was largely based on trial and error. The company of Carl Zeiss exploited this discovery and becomes the dominant microscope manufacturer of its era.
- 1928: Edward Hutchinson Synge publishes theory underlying the near-field scanning optical microscope
- 1931: Max Knoll and Ernst Ruska start to build the first electron microscope. It is a transmission electron microscope (TEM).
- 1936: Erwin Wilhelm Müller invents the field emission microscope.
- 1938: James Hillier builds another TEM.
- 1951: Erwin Wilhelm Müller invents the field ion microscope and is the first to see atoms.
- 1953: Frits Zernike, professor of theoretical physics, receives the Nobel Prize in Physics for his invention of the phase-contrast microscope.
- 1955: Georges Nomarski, professor of microscopy, published the theoretical basis of differential interference contrast microscopy.
- 1957: Marvin Minsky, a professor at MIT, invents the confocal microscope, an optical imaging technique for increasing optical resolution and contrast of a micrograph by means of using a spatial pinhole to block out-of-focus light in image formation. This technology is a predecessor to today's widely used confocal laser scanning microscope.
- 1967: Erwin Wilhelm Müller adds time-of-flight spectroscopy to the field ion microscope, making the first atom probe and allowing the chemical identification of each individual atom.
- 1981: Gerd Binnig and Heinrich Rohrer develop the scanning tunneling microscope (STM).
- 1986: Gerd Binnig, Quate, and Gerber invent the atomic force microscope (AFM).
- 1988: Alfred Cerezo, Terence Godfrey, and George D. W. Smith applied a position-sensitive detector to the atom probe, making it able to resolve materials in three dimensions with near-atomic resolution.
- 1988: Kingo Itaya invents the electrochemical scanning tunneling microscope.
- 1991: Kelvin probe force microscope invented.
- 2008: The scanning helium microscope is introduced.
