= TLK =

TLK may refer to:

- Talakan Airport (IATA code TLK), eastern Siberia, Russia
- Terrace Ledge Kink, a model in surface science
- The Latin Kings (hip hop group), a Swedish hip hop group
- Tuas Link MRT station (MRT station abbreviation TLK), Tuas, Singapore
- The Lion King Disney 1994 Film
- TLK-150, a Ukrainian uncrewed underwater vehicle
- Twoje Linie Kolejowe (formerly Tanie Linie Kolejowe), a brand of train services in Poland run by PKP Intercity
