= George D. W. Smith =

British materials scientist

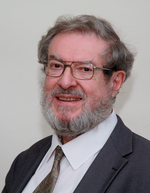
- G. D. W. Smith portrait via Oxford Materials
- Born: George David William Smith; 28 March 1943 (age 83); Aldershot, Hampshire, UK
- Education: Salesian College, Farnborough, University of Oxford
- Awards: FRS; FIMMM; FInstP; FRSC; CEng
- Scientific career
- Fields: Metallurgy; Nanoscience; Atom Probe Tomography
- Website: www.materials.ox.ac.uk/peoplepages/smith.html

George David William Smith FRS, FIMMM, FInstP, FRSC, CEng (b. 1943, in Aldershot, Hampshire) is a materials scientist with special interest in the study of the microstructure, composition and properties of engineering materials at the atomic level. He invented, together with Alfred Cerezo and Terry Godfrey, the Atom-Probe Tomograph in 1988.

== Education and career ==
George D. W. Smith studied at Salesian College, Farnborough, he then graduated from Oxford with a metallurgy degree in 1965, and did postgraduate work in the Chemistry Department, where he used the field emission microscope and the field ion microscope to study the epitaxial growth of nickel on tungsten. Smith returned to the Department of Materials where he worked as a Postdoctoral Research Fellow with Sir Peter Hirsch to establish a research group for metallurgical field ion microscopy. He led the Oxford research group where Cerezo, Smith, and Godfrey developed novel atom probe techniques for the direct observation of solid materials in three dimensions on the atomic scale. Together with Oxford colleagues, he founded a spin-out company, Oxford Nanoscience Ltd., which is part of Cameca Instruments Inc., manufacturer of equipment for nanotechnology research.

He was elected Fellow of the Royal Society in 1996, and was member of its Executive Council from 2002 to 2004.

From 1997 to 2005 he served on the Council of the Institute of Materials, being vice President in 2002.

He was the founding chair of the Institute of Materials Nanomaterials and Nanotechnology Committee, and also chaired the First International Conference on Nanomaterials and Nanomanufacturing (London, UK, 2003).

From 2000 to 2005 he was Head of the Department of Materials at the University of Oxford.

From 2005 to 2011 he was a member of the Advisory Council of the British Library.

He is a member of the DBERR Energy Materials Advisory Group, and was the lead author of the 2007 DTI / MatUK report on Nuclear Energy Materials (Note that this set of 2007 Working Group reports also accurately predicted a forthcoming energy crisis around 2015).

He was the UK leader for the UK-China Partnership in Science, in the areas of Materials Science and Nanotechnology (2007–08), and chaired an international panel which reviewed the RCUK nanoscience programme (2009–10).

He officially retired from his academic post in Oxford in 2010, but continues to be active in research as an Emeritus Professor of Materials, and as an external consultant to an energy company.

He is also an Honorary Professor at the University of Science and Technology Beijing, an Advisory Professor at Chongqing University.

Within Oxford, he is an Honorary Fellow of Corpus Christi College and an Emeritus Fellow of both Trinity and St Cross Colleges.

He has published extensively on the subjects of phase transformations and phase stability in metals and alloys, and on the atomic scale structure and chemistry of catalyst surfaces. He is author of 2 books and over 350 scientific papers

== Awards and honours ==
- The Beilby Medal and Prize (1985)
- The Rosenhain Medal (1991))
- Fellow of the Royal Society (1996)
- NPL National Award for Innovation in Measurement (2004)
- The Acta Materialia Gold Medal (2005)
- The Institute of Materials Platinum Medal (2006)
- Fellow of the International Field Emission Society (2016)
- 2016 Distinguished Scientist in Physical Science of the Microscopy Society of America
- 2017 TMS William Hume-Rothery Award

The company Oxford Nanoscience Ltd. received several awards for its technological achievements, including an International Research and Development Award (1993), Prince of Wales Award for Innovation (1997), Millennium Product Designation (1998), and a DTI National Award for Innovative Measurement (2004).

== Summary of interests ==
- Nanoscience and nanotechnology
- Atom probe analysis
- Phase transformations
- Microstructure, composition and properties of engineering materials at the atomic level
- The role of alloy elements and trace additions on the microstructure, heat treatment and properties of steels and non-ferrous alloys
- Atomic scale studies of heterogeneous catalysis
- Materials for applications in nuclear fission and fusion reactors
- Long-term safety and stability of the engineering materials used in current-generation nuclear reactors, and those planned for use in future fusion energy production systems
