= Lothar Nordheim =

German–American theoretical physicist (1899–1985)

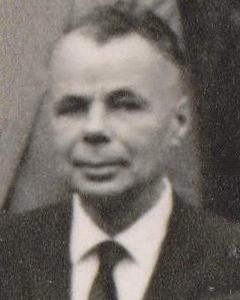
- Nordheim in 1963
- Born: Lothar Wolfgang Nordheim; November 7, 1899; Munich, Bavaria, Weimar Republic
- Died: October 10, 1985 (aged 85); La Jolla, California, US
- Education: University of Göttingen (Dr. phil.)
- Known for: Fowler–Nordheim-type equations; Fowler–Nordheim tunneling
- Spouse: Gertrud Pöschl (m. 1935)
- Scientific career
- Fields: Statistical physics; Quantum physics
- Workplaces: Duke University
- Thesis: Zur Behandlung entarteter Systeme in der Störungsrechnung (1923)
- Doctoral advisor: Max Born

Lothar Wolfgang Nordheim (November 7, 1899 – October 5, 1985) was a German–American theoretical physicist. He was a pioneer in the applications of quantum mechanics to solid-state problems, such as thermionic emission, work function of metals, field electron emission, rectification in metal-semiconductor contacts and electrical resistance in metals and alloys. He also worked in the mathematical foundations of quantum mechanics, cosmic rays and in nuclear physics.

== Biography ==
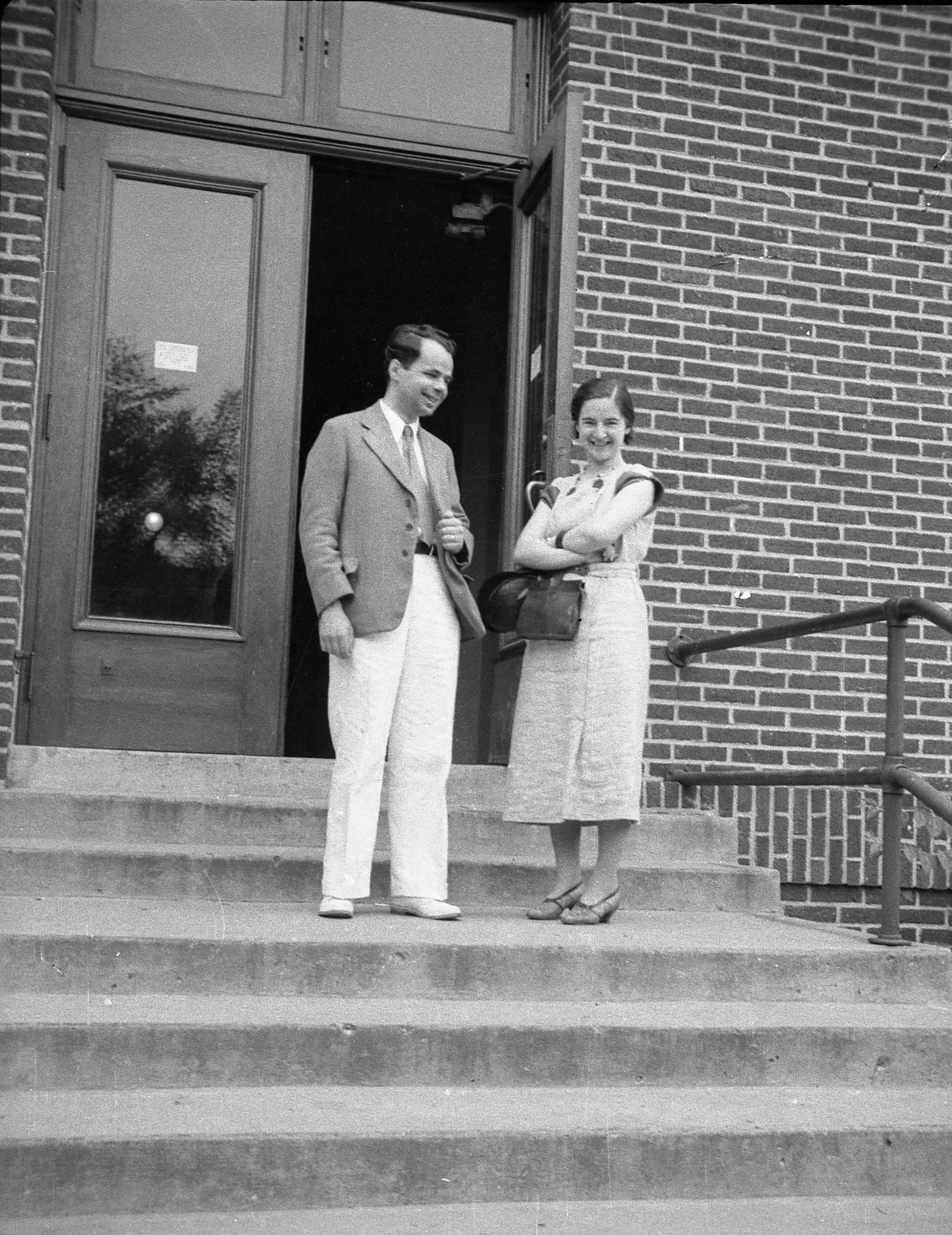
Lothar and Gertrud Nordheim in Ann Arbor

Lothar Wolfgang Nordheim was born on November 7, 1899, in Munich, Germany. In 1923, he received his Ph.D. in Physics, under Max Born, from the University of Göttingen. He also worked with Edward Teller on the muon, sparkling his interest in cosmic rays.

As a physical assistant to David Hilbert (like his teacher Born before him), Nordheim worked with him John von Neumann and Eugene Wigner on the mathematical formulation of quantum mechanics in 1928.

Nordheim wrote extensive articles for the Lehrbuch der Physik by J. H. J. Müller and Claude Pouillet on the quantum theory of magnetism and the conduction phenomena in metals. During the same period, he held a Rockefeller Foundation Research Fellowship and a Lorentz Fellowship. He lectured at Göttingen and was also a visiting professor at the University of Moscow.

In the early 1930s, Nordheim became interested in Fermi's theory of beta decay and worked with Hans Bethe on meson decay.

Upon his immigration to the United States in 1934, Nordheim served as a visiting professor at Purdue University, working on cosmic rays, before moving on to a permanent faculty position at Duke University in 1937.

In 1935, Nordheim married Gertrud Pöschl, a physicist, and together they worked on structure and spectra of polyatomic molecules.

During the World War II, Nordheim worked as a member of the Manhattan Project as head of department in the Clinton Laboratories in Oak Ridge and from 1945 to 1947 as head of the Physics Department there.

Gertrud died in an accident during a stay in Germany in 1949; Nordheim was deeply affected. He later decided to move to California. In 1956, he became a scientist at the John L. Hopkins Laboratory of Pure and Applied Science of General Atomics in San Diego and later chairman of the Theoretical Physics Department. There he mainly dealt with the physics of nuclear reactors and neutron physics. In the early 1950s, however, he also made early contributions to the nuclear shell model with Maria Goeppert-Mayer.

In 1936, Nordheim was elected a Fellow of the American Physical Society. He received honorary Doctor of Science degrees from the Karlsruhe Institute of Technology in 1951 and from Purdue University in 1963. He was also the first to give the Fritz London Memorial Lecture at Duke University in 1956.

Nordheim died on October 10, 1985, in La Jolla, California, at the age of 85.

== Field electron emission ==
An important contribution, with the British physicist Ralph Fowler in 1928, was to establish the correct physical explanation of the physical phenomenon now called field electron emission. They established that electron emission occurred by a form of wave-mechanical tunneling, now called Fowler–Nordheim tunneling, and, with the help of the assumption that electrons in metals obeyed Fermi–Dirac statistics, derived an (approximate) emission equation. Over time, this equation has been developed into a family of approximate equations (offering different degrees of approximation to reality, when describing field emission from bulk metals), known as Fowler–Nordheim-type equations.

Fowler–Nordheim tunneling was the first effect in physics to be firmly identified as due to wave-mechanical tunneling, in the early days of quantum mechanics. The original Fowler–Nordheim-type equation was one of the first to use Fermi–Dirac statistics to explain an experimental phenomenon involving electrons in metals, and its success greatly helped to establish modern electron band theory. The Fowler–Nordheim paper also established the physical basis for a unified treatment of field-induced and thermally induced electron emission.

The ideas of J. Robert Oppenheimer, Fowler and Nordheim were also an important stimulus to the development, by George Gamow, and Ronald W. Gurney and Edward Condon, later in 1928, for the theory of the radioactive decay of nuclei (by alpha particle tunneling).
