= Field-emission microscopy =

Analytical technique used in materials science

Field-emission microscopy (FEM) is an analytical technique that is used in materials science to study the surfaces of needle apexes. The FEM was invented by Erwin Wilhelm Müller in 1936, and it was one of the first surface-analysis instruments that could approach near-atomic resolution.

== Introduction ==
Microscopy techniques are utilized to generate magnified real-space images of the surface of a tip apex. Typically, microscopy information pertains to the surface crystallography (i.e., how the atoms are arranged at the surface) and surface morphology (i.e., the shape and size of topographic features making the surface).

Field-emission microscopy (FEM) was invented by Erwin Müller in 1936. In FEM, the phenomenon of field electron emission was used to obtain an image on the detector based on the difference in work function of the various crystallographic planes on the surface.

== Setup and working principle ==
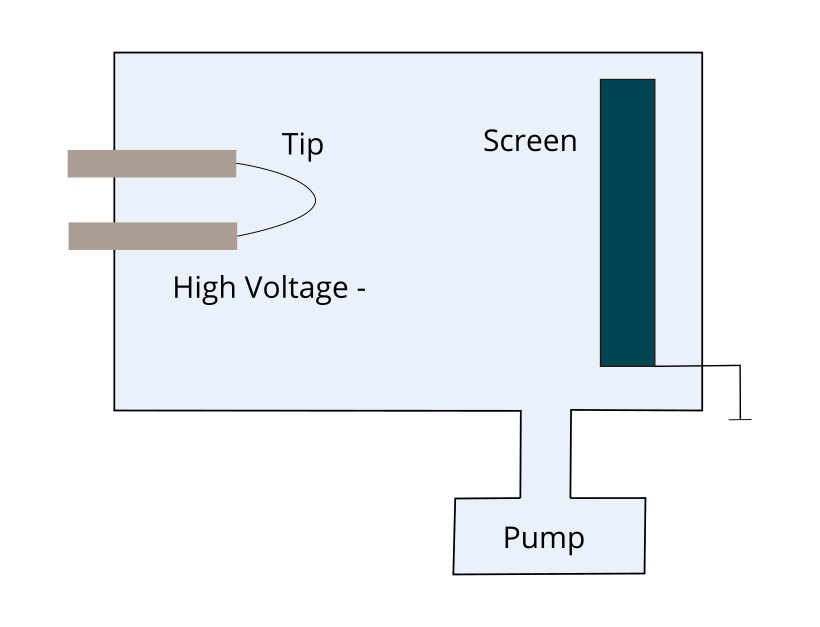
FEM experimental set-up

A field-emission microscope consists of a metallic sample shaped like a sharp tip and a fluorescent screen enclosed within an ultrahigh vacuum chamber. Typically, the tip radius used in this microscope is on the order of 100 nm, and it is made of a metal with a high melting point, such as tungsten. The sample is held at a large negative potential (1–10 kV) relative to the fluorescent screen, which generates an electric field near the tip apex of 2-7 billion V/m. This electric field drives field emission of electrons.

The field-emitted electrons travel along the field lines and produce bright and dark patches on the fluorescent screen, exhibiting a one-to-one correspondence with the crystal planes of the hemispherical emitter. The emission current strongly varies with the local work function, following the Fowler–Nordheim equation. Therefore, the FEM image reflects the projected work function map of the emitter surface. Generally, atomically rough surfaces have lower work functions than closely packed surfaces, resulting in bright areas in the image. In short, the intensity variations of the screen correspond to the work function map of the surface of the tip apex.

The magnification is given by the ratio $M = L/R$, where $R$ is the tip apex radius, and $L$ is the tip–screen distance. Linear magnifications of the order of 10^{5} are attained. The FEM technique has a spatial resolution of around 1 - 2 nm. Nonetheless, if a particle with a size of 1 nm is placed on a tip apex, the magnification can increase by a factor of 20, and the spatial resolution is enhanced to approximately 0.3 nm. This situation can be achieved by utilizing single-molecule electron emitters, and it is possible to observe molecular orbitals in single fullerene molecules using FEM.

Application of FEM is limited by the materials that can be fabricated in the shape of a sharp tip and can tolerate high electrostatic fields. For these reasons, refractory metals with high melting temperatures (e.g., W, Mo, Pt, Ir) are conventional objects for FEM experiments. In addition, the FEM has also been used to study adsorption and surface diffusion processes, making use of the work-function change associated with the adsorption process.

== See also ==
- Atom probe
- Electron microscope
- Field ion microscope
- List of surface analysis methods
