= Erwin Wilhelm Müller =

German American physicist and inventor

Erwin Wilhelm Müller (or Mueller) (June 13, 1911 – May 17, 1977) was a German physicist who invented the Field Emission Electron Microscope (FEEM), the Field Ion Microscope (FIM), and the Atom-Probe Field Ion Microscope. He and his student, Kanwar Bahadur, were the first people to experimentally observe atoms.

== Life and work ==
Müller was born in Berlin, where he studied at the Technische Hochschule in Charlottenburg (now Technische Universität Berlin) under Gustav Hertz. He received his degree in engineering in 1935 and his doctorate in 1936. Müller worked at the Siemens Research Laboratory, where he invented the field emission microscope in 1936 that allowed resolutions of 2 nanometers.

Müller married Klara Thüssing in 1939, and their only daughter Jutta was born in 1940. Due to the circumstances of war, he also worked at the Stabilovolt Company.

In 1947, he was appointed to the Kaiser Wilhelm Institute for Physical Chemistry and Electrochemistry (renamed to Fritz-Haber-Institut on the occasion of its incorporation into the Max Planck Society in 1953) by Iwan N. Stranski. Here he developed the field ion microscope which, due to its resolution of 0.25 nm, was the first instrument used to observe atoms.

In 1950, he took a teaching appointment at Technische Universität Berlin after finally having completed the required Privatdozent (habilitation). In 1951, he became professor at the Free University Berlin.

Müller joined the faculty at Pennsylvania State University in 1952, where he remained until his death in 1977. He co-invented the Atom-Probe Field Ion Microscope at Penn State in 1967. He died in Washington D.C.

== Honors ==
- National Medal of Science (1977)
- Achievement Award of the Instrument Society of America (1960)
- Davisson-Germer Prize of the American Physical Society (1972)
- Carl Friedrich Gauß Medal (de:Carl-Friedrich-Gauß-Medaille) (1952)
- John Scott Medal of the City of Philadelphia (1970)
- External Scientific Member, Fritz-Haber-Institut (1957)
- Honorary Degree, Free University of Berlin (1968)
- Honorary Degree, University of Lyon
- Medard W. Welch Award 1971
- American Physical Society 1971

== Selected bibliography ==
- Müller, E. W. (1951). "Das Feldionenmikroskop". Zeitschrift für Physik. 131 (1): 136–142. Bibcode:1951ZPhy..131..136M. doi:10.1007/BF01329651. S2CID 186215763. Müller's first FIM paper. According to Melmed, "[this paper] provided the world's first view of the atomic nature of solid matter and began an entirely new field of study."
- Müller, E. (1956). "Field Desorption". Physical Review. 102 (3): 618–624. Bibcode:1956PhRv..102..618M. doi:10.1103/PhysRev.102.618.
- Müller, E.; Bahadur, K. (1956). "Field Ionization of Gases at a Metal Surface and the Resolution of the Field Ion Microscope". Physical Review. 102 (3): 624. Bibcode:1956PhRv..102..624M. doi:10.1103/PhysRev.102.624.
- Muller, E. W. (1965). "Field Ion Microscopy". Science. 149 (3684): 591–601. Bibcode:1965Sci...149..591M. doi:10.1126/science.149.3684.591. JSTOR 1716643. PMID 17747566. S2CID 34915155.
- Muller, E. W.; Rendulic, K. D. (1967). "Field Ion Microscopical Imaging of Biomolecules". Science. 156 (3777): 961–963. Bibcode:1967Sci...156..961M. doi:10.1126/science.156.3777.961. JSTOR 1721548. PMID 4290252. S2CID 6471447.
