= Field ion microscope =

Type of microscope invented by Erwin Wilhelm Müller

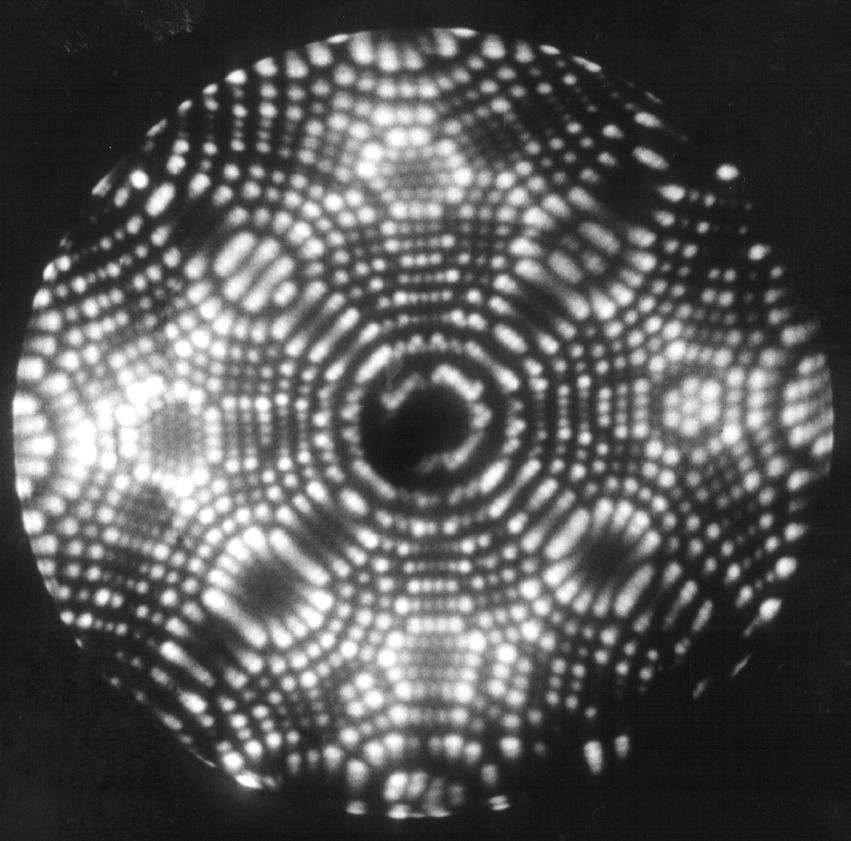
Field ion microscope image of the end of a sharp platinum needle. Each bright spot is a platinum atom.

The field-ion microscope (FIM) was invented by Müller in 1951. It is a type of microscope that can be used to image the arrangement of atoms at the surface of a sharp metal tip.

On October 11, 1955, Erwin Müller and his Ph.D. student, Kanwar Bahadur (Pennsylvania State University) observed individual tungsten atoms on the surface of a sharply pointed tungsten tip by cooling it to 21 K and employing helium as the imaging gas. Müller & Bahadur were the first persons to observe individual atoms directly.

== Introduction ==
In FIM, a sharp (<50 nm tip radius) metal tip is produced and placed in an ultra high vacuum chamber, which is backfilled with an imaging gas such as helium or neon. The tip is cooled to cryogenic temperatures (20–100 K). A positive voltage of 5 to 10 kilovolts is applied to the tip. Gas atoms adsorbed on the tip are ionized by the strong electric field in the vicinity of the tip (thus, "field ionization"), becoming positively charged and being repelled from the tip. The curvature of the surface near the tip causes a natural magnification — ions are repelled in a direction roughly perpendicular to the surface (a "point projection" effect). A detector is placed so as to collect these repelled ions; the image formed from all the collected ions can be of sufficient resolution to image individual atoms on the tip surface.

Unlike conventional microscopes, where the spatial resolution is limited by the wavelength of the particles which are used for imaging, the FIM is a projection type microscope with atomic resolution and an approximate magnification of a few million times.

== Design, limitations and applications ==
FIM like field-emission microscopy (FEM) consists of a sharp sample tip and a fluorescent screen (now replaced by a multichannel plate) as the key elements. However, there are some essential differences as follows:

1. The tip potential is positive.
2. The chamber is filled with an imaging gas (typically, He or Ne at 10^{−5} to 10^{−3} Torr).
3. The tip is cooled to low temperatures (~20-80K).

Like FEM, the field strength at the tip apex is typically a few V/Å. The experimental set-up and image formation in FIM is illustrated in the accompanying figures.

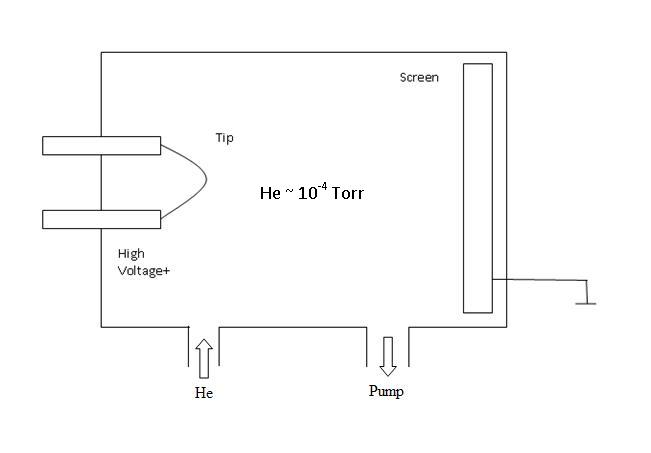
FIM experimental set-up.

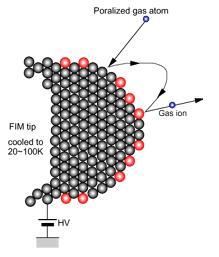
FIM image formation process.

In FIM the presence of a strong field is critical. The imaging gas atoms (He, Ne) near the tip are polarized by the field and since the field is non-uniform the polarized atoms are attracted towards the tip surface. The imaging atoms then lose their kinetic energy performing a series of hops and accommodate to the tip temperature. Eventually, the imaging atoms are ionized by tunneling electrons into the surface and the resulting positive ions are accelerated along the field lines to the screen to form a highly magnified image of the sample tip.

In FIM, the ionization takes place close to the tip, where the field is strongest. The electron that tunnels from the atom is picked up by the tip. There is a critical distance, xc, at which the tunneling probability is a maximum. This distance is typically about 0.4 nm. The very high spatial resolution and high contrast for features on the atomic scale arises from the fact that the electric field is enhanced in the vicinity of the surface atoms because of the higher local curvature. The resolution of FIM is limited by the thermal velocity of the imaging ion. Resolution of the order of 1Å (atomic resolution) can be achieved by effective cooling of the tip.

Application of FIM, like FEM, is limited by the materials which can be fabricated in the shape of a sharp tip, can be used in an ultra high vacuum (UHV) environment, and can tolerate the high electrostatic fields. For these reasons, refractory metals with high melting temperature (e.g. W, Mo, Pt, Ir) are conventional objects for FIM experiments. Metal tips for FEM and FIM are prepared by electropolishing (electrochemical polishing) of thin wires. However, these tips usually contain many asperities. The final preparation procedure involves the in situ removal of these asperities by field evaporation just by raising the tip voltage. Field evaporation is a field induced process which involves the removal of atoms from the surface itself at very high field strengths and typically occurs in the range 2-5 V/Å. The effect of the field in this case is to reduce the effective binding energy of the atom to the surface and to give, in effect, a greatly increased evaporation rate relative to that expected at that temperature at zero fields. This process is self-regulating since the atoms that are at positions of high local curvature, such as adatoms or ledge atoms, are removed preferentially. The tips used in FIM is sharper (tip radius is 100~300 Å) compared to those used in FEM experiments (tip radius ~1000 Å).

FIM has been used to study dynamical behavior of surfaces and the behavior of adatoms on surfaces. The problems studied include adsorption-desorption phenomena, surface diffusion of adatoms and clusters, adatom-adatom interactions, step motion, equilibrium crystal shape, etc. However, there is the possibility of the results being affected by the limited surface area (i.e. edge effects) and by the presence of large electric field.

== See also ==
- Atom probe
- Electron microscope
- Field emission microscopy
- List of surface analysis methods
