= Orloff =

Orloff is a variant of Orlov. Both are derived from the Slavic word orel (meaning "eagle". (disambiguation)) Orloff may refer to:

== People ==
- Orloff M. Dorman (1809–1879), justice of the Supreme Court of Virginia
- Ben Orloff (born 1987), minor League Baseball player
- Carolina Orloff (born 1977), Argentine translator
- Chana Orloff (1888–1968), sculptor
- Chet Orloff (born 1949), American historian, writer and professor of urban studies
- Gene Orloff (1921–2009), American jazz violinist, concertmaster, arranger
- Jon Orloff (born 1942), American physicist
- Judith Orloff, American psychiatrist, author and energy medicine practitioner
- Monford Orloff (1914–2000), American businessman and philanthropist
- Nicholas W. Orloff, Russian KGB agent in the United States
- Zvi Nishri (Orloff, 1878–1973), Russian/Palestinian/Israeli pioneer in modern physical education
- Dr. Orloff, a character in films by Jesús Franco

== Other ==
- Orloff (chicken), a breed of chicken
- Orlov (diamond), a large diamond, sometimes known as the "Orloff"
- Orloff vodka, a brand of vodka
- Veal Orloff, a 19th-century dish of Franco-Russian cuisine

== See also ==
- Orlov (disambiguation)
