= OGI School of Science and Engineering =

- Type: Private university
- Established: 1963
- Postgraduates: 350
- Location: Portland, and Hillsboro, Oregon, USA; 45°31′50″N 122°52′46″W
- Campus: Urban

The OGI School of Science and Engineering, located in Hillsboro, Oregon, United States was one of four schools at the Oregon Health and Science University (OHSU). Until June 2001, it functioned independently as a private graduate school, the Oregon Graduate Institute of Science & Technology (OGI). OGI operated four departments and had approximately 330 students. In 2008, the school's name was changed to the Department of Science and Engineering and by 2010, the department was dissolved and the academic programs and research were disseminated to other OHSU institutes and departments.

== History ==
OGI was chartered in 1963 by the Oregon Legislature to provide graduate-level training and expertise to the state's rapidly expanding high-tech industry, including Silicon Forest companies. Tektronix co-founder Howard Vollum helped found OGI in 1965 with a $2 million grant, and upon his death in 1986, he bequeathed $14.8 million to the college as an endowment. The school started as the Oregon Graduate Center located on Barnes Road. OGI’s first president was Donald Benedict who was selected for the position in 1966. In 1968, the school purchased 74 acres (300,000 m^{2}) on Walker Road near 185th Avenue in an unincorporated section of Washington County for a new campus. That campus opened on August 15, 1969, complete with a dedication by Senator Mark Hatfield.

In 1988, the state recruited OGI to teach some classes for the Oregon Center for Advanced Technology Education. During the 1990s the school awarded over one thousand graduate degrees, offered hundreds of continuing education seminars and workshops, and secured more than $100 million in largely federally funded research. In 2001, OGI merged with Oregon Health Sciences University, with OGI becoming the School of Science and Engineering and OHSU changing its name to become Oregon Health & Science University. In 2006, the school began a seven-year process of relocating to OHSU's South Waterfront campus in Portland and sold part of its Hillsboro campus.

== Academics ==
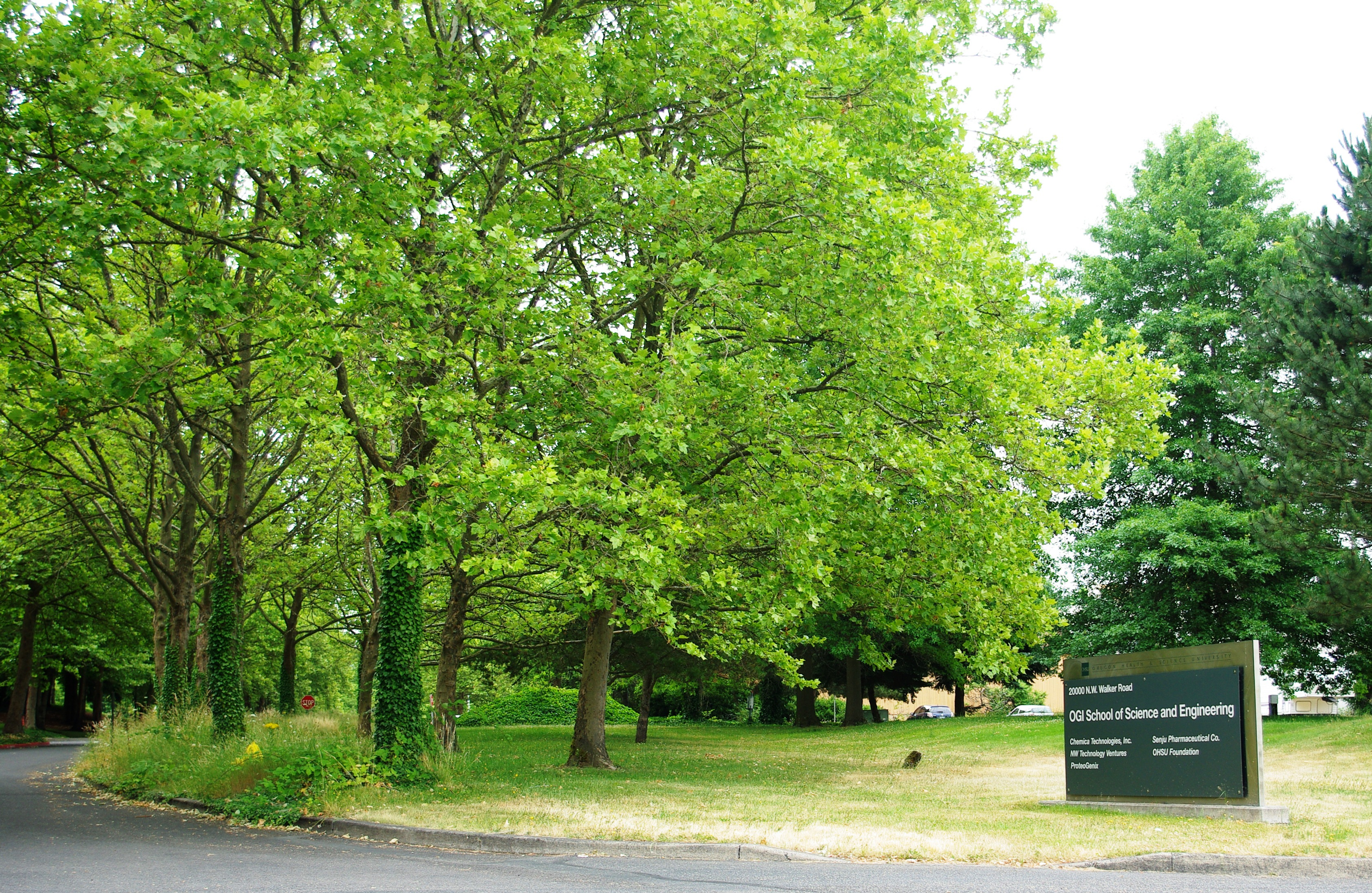
Entrance to the campus in Hillsboro

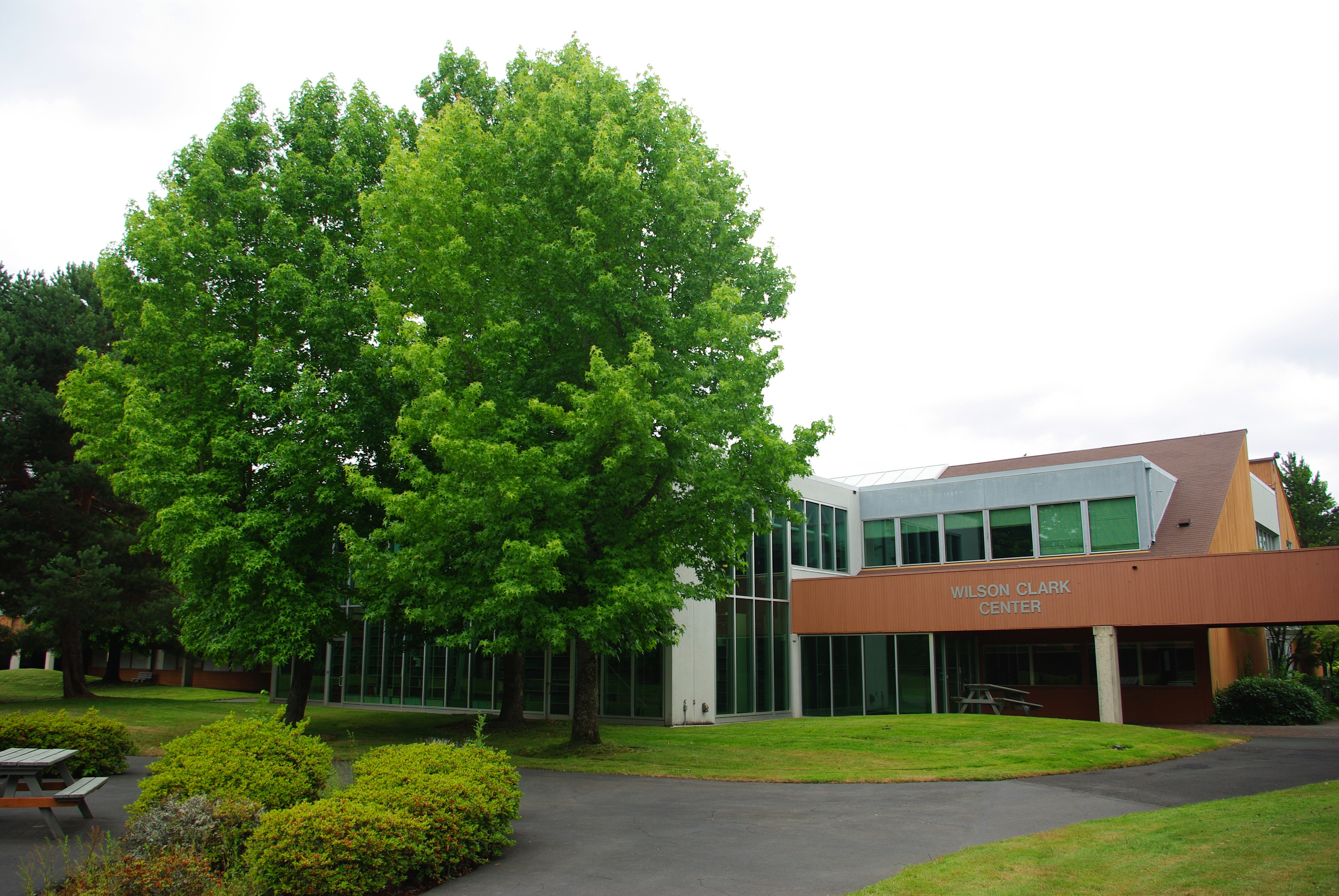
Quad area and library on campus

The OGI School of Science and Engineering had four divisions: Biomedical Engineering, Biomedical Computer Science, and Environmental & Biomolecular Systems. It had a student body of about 330 full-time students, with about one-third of those seeking PhDs. The student body also included about 250 non-degree students.

Since OGI's merger with OHSU, research conducted at the School has increasingly focused on applying technology to complex problems of human and ecosystem health. The school's Department of Management in Science and Technology (MST) focused on educating leaders and managers in a technology-intensive world. The program changed to OHSU's Division of Management offering a certificate and master's degrees in Healthcare Management.

Formal research centers at the school included the Adaptive Systems Lab, Biomedical Optics Group, Center for Coastal and Land Margin Research, Center for Groundwater Research, Center for Global Change Science and Center for Spoken Language Understanding, whose focus is on spoken language technologies and continues to offer Computer Science and Electrical Engineering degrees. Ten faculty members from OGI, including the members of the Pacific Software Research Center as well as other research groups, moved to Portland State University in 2004. Other areas of faculty research included cell and tissue engineering, neuroengineering, and materials microanalysis and micro-fabrication.
