= Orlov =

Orlov or Orlova may refer to:

== Places ==
- Orlov, Russia (Orlova), several inhabited localities in Russia
- Orlov, Stará Ľubovňa District, a village in Slovakia
- Orlová, a town in the Moravian-Silesian Region, Czech Republic
- Orlov, a village and part of Vračovice-Orlov in the Pardubice Region, Czech Republic

== People ==
- Orlov (family), Russian nobility
- Orlov (surname) (including Orlova)

== Other ==
- Orlov (crater), lunar crater
- Orlov Revolt, 18th-cen. incident in Russo-Turkish War
- Orlov Trotter, breed of horse, named after the Russian family
- Orlov, or Veal Orloff, 19th-century Franco-Russian cuisine item
- Orlov (diamond) or Great Mogul Diamond, a Golconda diamond from India; now part of the Russian Diamond Fund

== See also ==
- General Orlov (disambiguation)
- Orlav, a character in the film 30 Days of Night: Red Snow
- Orloff (disambiguation)
