= Pageant of Oregon History =

1940 mural in Portland, Oregon, U.S.

- Artist: Erich Lamade
- Year: 1940
- Location: Portland, Oregon, United States

Pageant of Oregon History, or A Pageant of Oregon History, is a 300-square-foot (28 m^{2}) mural by Erich Lamade, painted on the interior of Abernethy Elementary School in southeast Portland, Oregon's Hosford-Abernethy neighborhood, in the United States.

== Description ==
Erich Lamade's Pageant of Oregon History is a 300-square-foot (28 m^{2}) mural, painted on four walls of the school's library. It depicts the history of Oregon in chronological order.

== History ==
The mural was commissioned by the Works Progress Administration in the 1930s as part of Federal Project Number One, and completed in 1940. It was covered by six coats of interior paint starting in the mid-1950s. The painting was partly uncovered in 2007, and preservation efforts began. In 2017, the city's Heritage Conservation Group and the school's Parent-Teacher Association (PTA) led a fundraising campaign to fund a $71,274 restoration project. Financial contributors included $20,000 from the Oregon Heritage Commission, $15,000 from the National Trust for Historic Preservation, and $5,000 from the Autzen Foundation; additional funds were raised from a GoFundMe campaign, launched in December. The restoration began during mid 2018, starting with the room's south and southeast walls using methods developed by Portland State University's Regional Laboratory for the Science of Cultural Heritage Conservation. Restoration work cannot be completed during the academic calendar and is slated to begin again during mid 2019. Local historian Chet Orloff supports the mural's restoration.

== See also ==
- 1940 in art
