= EBID =

EBID may refer to:

- Electron beam-induced deposition, a nanoscale deposition technique
- Evidence-based individual decision making, see Evidence-based medicine
