= FundsIndia =

Online investment website

- Headquarters: IndiQube Wave, 3rd Floor, 438/1 T.R Sundaram Avenue, Anna Salai, Chennai
- Owner: Wealth India Financial Services
- CEO: Akshay Sapru
- Products: Mutual funds, SIP, stocks, equities, corporate deposits, bonds, IPOs, and NCDs
- Services: Advisory services, different types of SIPs, ready-to-go portfolios, Robo-advisory services (Money Mitr), trigger-based investing, Portfolio X-Ray, Value-averaging Investment Plans (VIPs), e-insurance repository, and other financial services
- Website: www.fundsindia.com

FundsIndia (est. 2009) is an online investment website headquartered in Chennai, Tamil Nadu. The website is owned by Wealth India Financial Services Pvt. Ltd. It was initially created just for mutual funds but later introduced other investment products like stocks, corporate fixed deposits, bonds, and more. FundsIndia was founded by C.R. Chandrasekar and Srikanth Meenakshi, alumnus of the University of Hyderabad.

== History ==
Chandrasekar and Srikanth, were hostel mates while pursuing their Masters in Computer Applications (MCA) at the University of Hyderabad, Andhra Pradesh, in 1990. After they completed their post-graduation there, they both moved to the United States of America to pursue their postgraduate degree in Computer Science. Chandrasekar pursued his Masters at Virginia Tech in Blacksburg, Virginia, while Srikanth studied at the Oregon Graduate Institute in Portland, Oregon. They both began working in a variety of high-profile jobs in the field of financial services and after over a decade, they decided to return to India in order to stay closer to their respective families. Eventually, they decided to launch an online mutual fund investment website together after realizing that most platforms in the country only offered access to investments in equities online. Hence, FundsIndia was launched on 16 June 2009.

Initially, Chandrasekar and Srikanth pooled in their savings of about ₹1.5 crore in order to launch FundsIndia in 2009. In 2010, the company found that they required additional funding to fuel their growth and hence, they approached the venture capital firm, Inventus Capital Partners. However, the company was asked to approach them for funding at a later date, once it had shown a good performance record. Within nine months, FundsIndia was successful in acquiring several customers and earning higher revenues. Impressed by their performance, Inventus Capital Partners invested ₹3 crore in the firm. This was FundsIndia’s Series A round of funding that was used to expand their customer base and introduce new products and services. After this, Parag Dhol, the Managing Director of Inventus Capital Partners assumed the post of Director in FundsIndia’s management. In July 2012, the company raised an amount of ₹20 crore in its Series B round of funding that was led by the Silicon Valley–based venture capital firm, Foundation Capital. Inventus Capital Partners also participated in this round of funding. After this round of investment, Ashu Garg, General Partner, Foundation Capital, also assumed a post as director at FundsIndia. In June 2015, the company further raised an amount of ₹70 crore in its Series C round of funding. This round of funding was led by the venture capital firm, Faering Capital, with follow-on investments from current investors, Foundation Capital, and Inventus Capital Partners. After this round of investment, both Sameer Shroff and Aditya Parekh, co-founders and Managing Directors, Faering Capital, assumed a post each as director at FundsIndia.
