= FEI Company =

American microscope technology company

Coordinates: 45.542697°N 122.92963°W

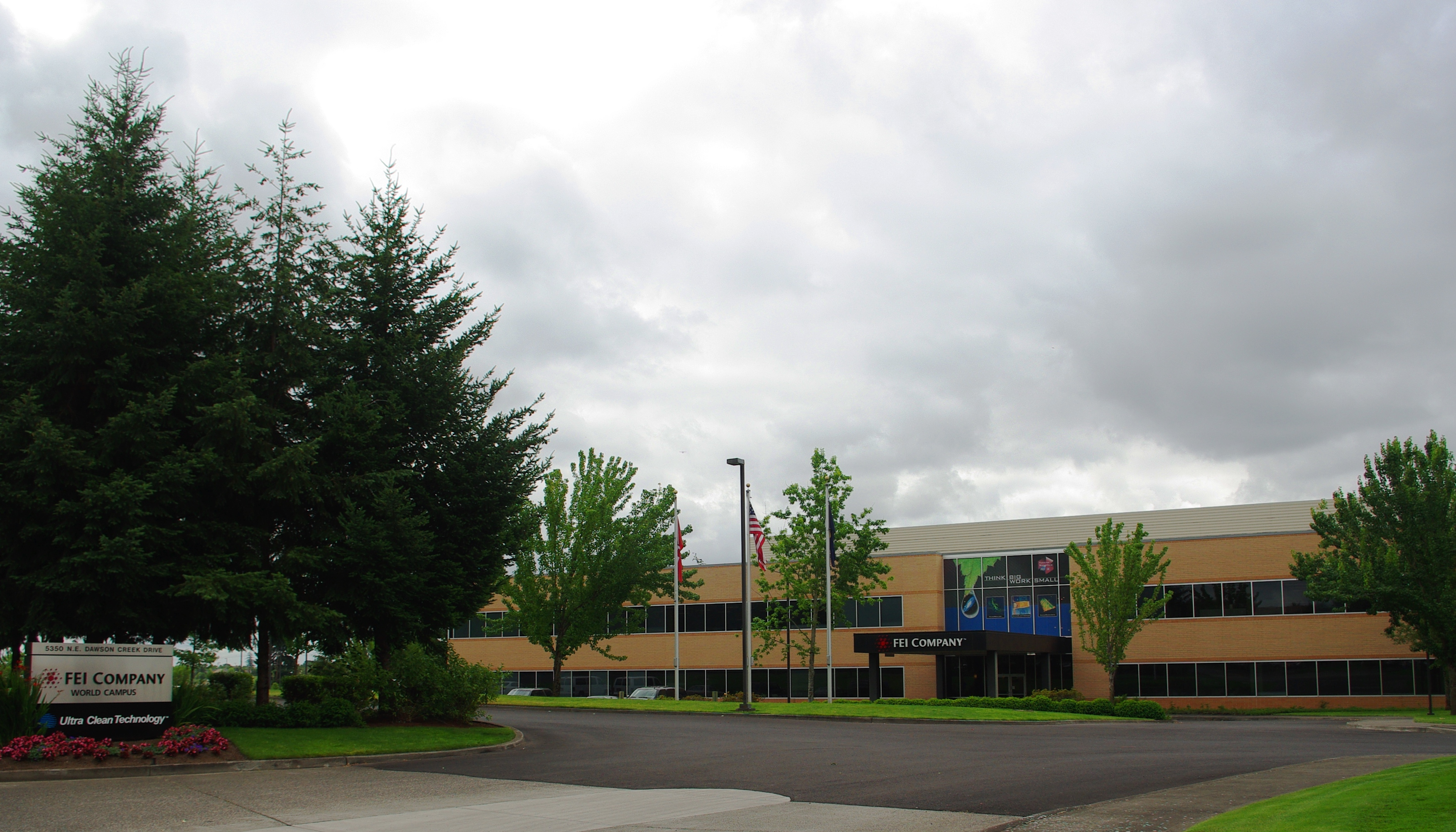
- Corporate headquarters
- Type: Subsidiary
- Traded as: Nasdaq: FEIC
- Industry: Scientific and Technical Instruments
- Founded: 1971; 55 years ago
- Founder: Dr. Lynwood Swanson
- Headquarters: Hillsboro, Oregon, United States
- Area served: global
- Key people: Dr. Don R. Kania (CEO), Anthony Trunzo (EVP and CFO); Bradley J. Thies (vice president, General Counsel)
- Products: Focused ion beam scanning electron microscope transmission electron microscope DualBeam, light microscope, software
- Revenue: ▼$930M (2015)
- Operating income: ▲$129.4M (2014)
- Net income: ▲$105.1M (2014)
- Number of employees: 2800+ (2015)
- Parent: Thermo Fisher Scientific
- Subsidiaries: ASPEX Corporation (dba FEI Delmont) (Pennsylvania, United States), Visualization Sciences Group Inc. (dba FEI Houston) (United States) and 26 others.
- Website: www.fei.com

FEI Company (Field Electron and Ion Company) was an American company that designed, manufactured, and supported microscope technology. Headquartered in Hillsboro, Oregon, FEI had over 2,800 employees and sales and service operations in more than 50 countries around the world. Formerly listed on the NASDAQ, it is now a subsidiary of Thermo Fisher Scientific.

== History ==
The FEI company was founded in 1971 as Field Electron and Ion Company by Dr. Lynwood W. Swanson, Mr. Noel A. Martin and Mr. Lloyd Swenson, as a supplier of electron and ion beam sources for field emission research and electron microscopy. The name was shortened to FEI Company in 1973. In 1978, Dr. J.H. Orloff, a research specialist in electrostatic optics for field emission ion and electron sources, joined the company as its fourth partner. Swanson was a professor of applied physics at the Oregon Graduate Center, and Orloff's doctoral adviser. FEI's introduction of the liquid metal ion source in 1981 led to its application in the semiconductor industry for mask repair and defect analysis. The current company was formed by the 1997 merger between FEI and Philips Electron Optics, and the 1999 acquisition of ion beam company Micrion. As such, the company can trace its roots in electron microscopy to the early commercial instruments produced by Philips Electron Optics in the 1940s.

On December 20, 2006, Philips Business Electronics International B.V. sold its shares of common stock in FEI Company reducing its shareholding in FEI to zero. In May 2011, the company announced a second straight quarter of record revenue and profits, with the company totaling nearly $200 million in revenue for their second quarter. The company attributed the growth to a diversification of its clientele.

On May 27, 2016, Thermo Fisher Scientific Inc. announced its acquisition of FEI Company for US$4.2 billion, which commenced in early 2017. At the time of the transaction, FEI had more than 2700 employees in over 20 countries. The FEI trademark was phased out in favor of the Materials & Structural Analysis division of Thermo Fisher Scientific.

== Operations ==
The products manufactured by the division include focused ion beam workstations, scanning electron microscopes, transmission electron microscopes, and focusing columns, as well as computer software used in image acquisition, reconstruction, and analysis.

The division has research and development centers in Hillsboro, Oregon; Eindhoven, The Netherlands; Munich, Germany; Shanghai, China PRC; Tokyo, Japan; Brno, Czech Republic; Canberra, Australia; Trondheim, Norway; and Bordeaux, France. It has sales and service operations in more than 50 countries.

== Subsidiaries ==
- FEI Technologies Inc. (Oregon, United States)
- ASPEX Corporation (dba FEI Delmont) (Pennsylvania, United States)
- Visualization Sciences Group Inc. (dba FEI Houston) (United States)
- FEI Electron Optics International B.V. (Netherlands)
- FEI Electron Optics B.V. (Netherlands)
- FEI Europe B.V. (Netherlands)
- FEI CPD B.V. (Netherlands)
- FEI Global Holdings C.V. (Netherlands)
- FEI Czech Republic s.r.o. (Czech Republic)
- FEI Munich GmbH (fka TILL Photonics GmbH) (Germany)
- FEI Deutschland GmbH (Germany)
- FEI France SAS (France)
- FEI SAS (fka Visualization Sciences Group SAS) (France)
- FEI UK Limited (United Kingdom)
- FEI Italia S.r.l. (Italy)
- FEI Norway Holding AS (fka Lithicon AS) (Norway)
- FEI Trondheim AS (fka Lithicon Norway AS) (Norway)
- FEI Servicos de Nanotechnologia Ltda (Brazil)
- FEI Technology de Mexico S.A. de C.V. (Mexico)
- FEI Company Japan Ltd. (Japan)
- FEI Trading (Shanghai) Co., Ltd. (China)
- FEI APR Co., Ltd. (China)
- FEI Hong Kong Company Limited (Hong Kong)
- FEI Korea Ltd. (South Korea)
- FEI Company of USA (S.E.A.) Pte Ltd (Singapore)
- FEI Melbourne Pty Ltd. (Australia)
- FEI Canberra Pty Ltd. (fka Lithicon Australia Pty Ltd.) (Australia)
- FEI Microscopy Solutions Ltd. (Israel)

== See also ==
- List of companies based in Oregon
