= Monford Orloff =

American lawyer

- Born: Monford Arthur Orloff; March 29, 1914; Omaha, Nebraska, U.S.
- Died: February 13, 2000 (aged 85); Portland, Oregon, U.S.
- Occupations: Business Executive, Financier, Philanthropist
- Spouse: Janice Diamond Orloff
- Children: Jon Orloff, Carole Orloff, Chester Orloff

Monford Arthur Orloff (March 29, 1914 – February 13, 2000) was an American businessman, financier, lawyer, and philanthropist. He was married to Janice Orloff and had three children Jon, Carole, and Chester. Orloff was known as an aggressive supporter of the arts.

== Career ==
Born in Omaha, Nebraska, he grew up in Nebraska and New York City and completed high school in Vancouver, British Columbia. He graduated from Stanford University in 1937 and was elected Phi Beta Kappa, in 1940 he graduated with a J.D. from Harvard Law School. He served in the U.S. Army in World War II first as an infantry officer then in intelligence.

In 1951, he settled in Bellingham, Washington and began practicing law there. In 1952, Mt Baker Plywood, one of his clients, was facing bankruptcy. Orloff signed on as general manager and successfully turned the company around.

In 1959, he bought the Aberdeen Plywood Co., in Aberdeen, Washington. As the CEO of Aberdeen Plywood and Veneers Inc. he orchestrated a merger with Plymouth, Michigan based Evans Products in 1961. He became president of Evans moving the corporate headquarters to Portland, Oregon, with the headquarters later moving to Miami. He later become CEO. Under Orloff's leadership the company developed a combination of retail building materials stores, building and wood products, railcar and trailer manufacturing, heavy equipment leasing and home building and financing.

In 1972, he resigned. Two years later, due to interest rate increases and cuts in housing starts bringing massive losses to Evans (the company saw its stock fall from $13 a share to $2 a share) Orloff returned to his post. He cut many of the company's money-losing sectors, bringing confidence back to his investors. In 1979, Evans' share price rebounded and the company produced $1.5 billion in annual sales.

Evans Products was taken over by Victor Posner in 1983 and Orloff stayed on as a consultant until 1985 at which time he became Chairman of FEI Corporation in Hillsboro, Oregon.

== Philanthropy and boards ==
Orloff donated generously to the arts and higher learning including $3 million to the Oregon Community Foundation for a performing arts center. He sat on the boards of the Oregon Community foundation, Reed College, OPB Foundation, the Oregon Symphony, the Portland Art Museum, the Oregon Art Institute, and Oregon Graduate Institute (OGI) board. As president of the Oregon Community Foundation, he vigorously supported the foundation's program to fund undergraduate and community college scholarships for Oregon and Clark County, Washington high school graduates.

== Honors ==
- Phi Beta Kappa
- Vice Chair of Reed College (1970–1990).
- Commissioner for Oregon Public Broadcasting.
- Chairman of the OGI Science Park.
- 1979 Reed College distinguished lay scholar.
- 1981 National Business Community Award for the Arts.
- 1982 Torch of Liberty Award for his "contributions to human relations and the pursuit of excellence in the community" by the Anti-Defamation League of B'nai B'rith.
- The National Conference of Christians and Jews' Oregon Brotherhood Award.
- Lewis & Clark College's Aubrey Watzek Award
- 1982 Oregon Governor's Arts Award
