= Lisa McElwee-White =

American researcher and professor of chemistry

- Education: University of Kansas (B.S.) (1979); California Institute of Technology (Ph.D) (1983); Stanford University (Postdoctoral Research Affiliate) (1983-1985)
- Scientific career
- Fields: Organometallic Chemistry
- Workplaces: University of Florida
- Thesis: Theoretical and Experimental Assessment of the Viability of 1,4,6,9-Spiro4.4Nonatetrayl as a Reactive Intermediate (1984)
- Doctoral advisor: Dennis A. Dougherty
- Other academic advisors: James P. Collman (Post-doctoral advisor)
- Website: lmwhite.chem.ufl.edu/index.html

Lisa McElwee-White is currently the Colonel Allen R. and Margaret G. Crow Professor of Chemistry at the University of Florida.

== Career ==
Lisa McElwee-White received her B.S. degree in Chemistry from the University of Kansas in 1979, and completed her Ph.D. degree at the California Institute of Technology under the supervision of Dennis A. Dougherty. After two years of postdoctoral work at Stanford University with James P. Collman, she joined the Stanford faculty as an assistant professor in Chemistry in 1985.

She moved to the University of Florida as an associate professor in 1993 and was promoted to Professor in 1997. Following a term as Associate Dean for Administrative Affairs in the College of Liberal Arts and Sciences, she returned to full-time conducting research and teaching in 1998. She currently serves as director of the UF Beckman Scholars Program and recently served as the Director of the NSF-CCI Center for Nanostructured Electronic Materials. Professor McElwee-White's current research interests center around the applications of organometallic chemistry in materials science.

Her work has been funded by a variety of federal agencies, foundations, and private companies including NSF, DOE, ARO, ONR, NASA, ACS-PRF, the Beckman Foundation, HHMI and FEI. She has authored more than 140 peer-reviewed publications and has presented more than 180 invited lectures. Her Editorial Board service includes Organometallics, the Journal of Organic Chemistry, Letters in Organic Chemistry and Current Organic Chemistry. She has recently served as Chair of the Division of Organic Chemistry of the American Chemical Society and was named as a Fellow of the American Chemical Society in 2010. Her recent awards include the Florida Award (2015) and the Charles H. Stone Award (2012).

== Research ==
=== Chemical Vapor Deposition ===
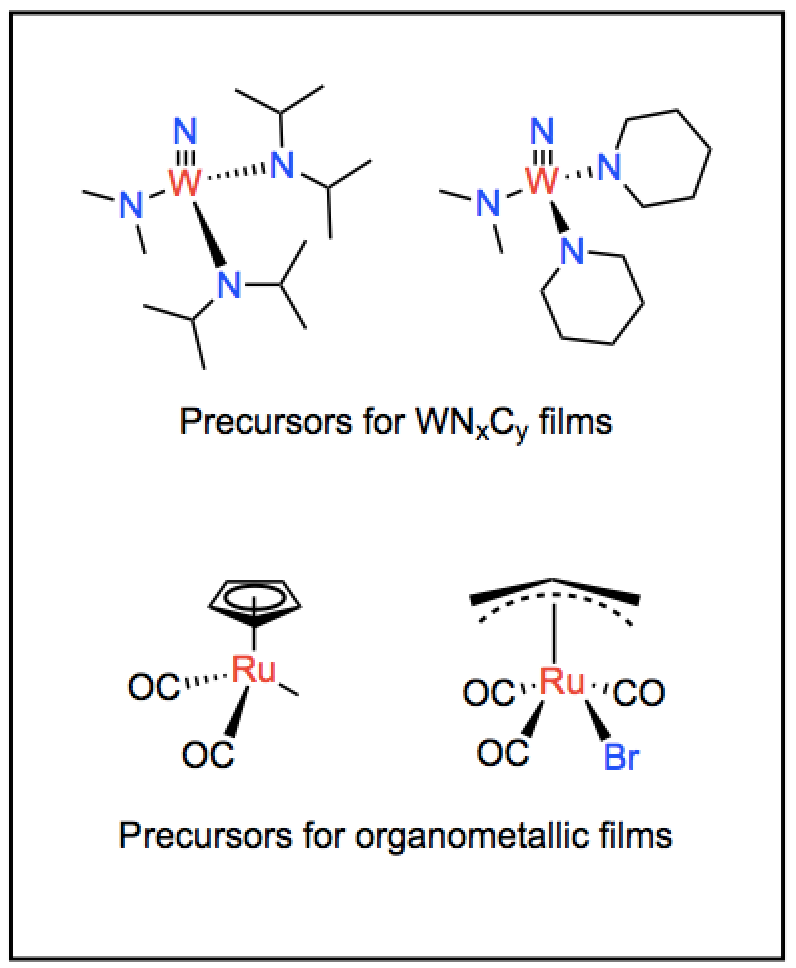
Precursors used in McElwee-White's research on CVD.

Chemical Vapor Deposition (CVD) is a technique that produces materials by depositing solid films. It has been a very attractive process because it is chemically selective process, the material produced is high-quality and high-performing, and the thickness of the film can be easily controlled.

McElwee-White has studied the various complexities of CVD on tungsten nitride and carbonitride films (WN_{x}C_{y} films), exploring tungsten nitrido complexes as precursors and analyzing the effect of ligand structure on the reaction. She has also expanded her research scope to the metallization of organic thin films. For the process of metallization of organic thin films, normal thermal CVD processes which require high temperatures usually destroy organic films. McElwee-White introduced photochemical CVD processes as an alternative, and employed ruthenium-based precursors.

=== Electron Beam-Induced Deposition ===
Electron beam-induced deposition (EBID) uses a high energy, focused electron beam to deposit nanomaterials onto a surface using organometallic precursors. It is useful because it is able to produce three-dimensional nanostructures with well-controlled size, shape and interparticle distance. McElwee-White has explored EBID using a variety of organometallic precursors, such as cis-Pt(CO)_{2}Cl_{2} to make pure platinum nanostructures and (η3-C_{3}H_{5})Ru(CO)_{3}Br to make Ru-based nanostructures and to study the effects of ligands.

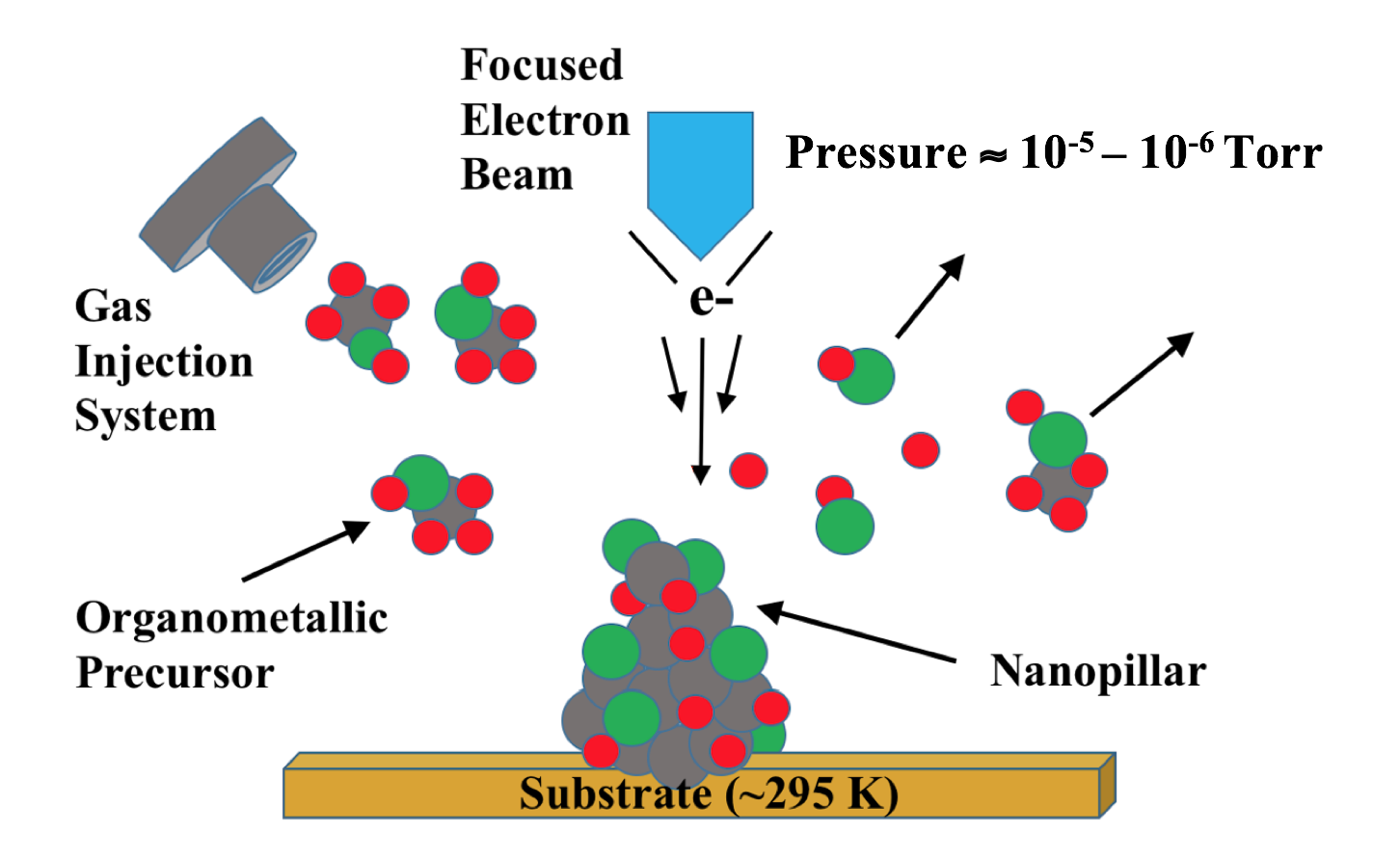
Pictorial representation of an EBID process.

=== Major publications ===
- "Design of Precursors for the CVD of Inorganic Thin Films," McElwee-White, L. Dalton Trans., 2006, 5327 - 5333.
- "Tungsten Nitrido Complexes as Precursors for Low Temperature Chemical Vapor Deposition of WN_{x}C_{y} Films as Diffusion Barriers for Cu Metallization," McClain, K.R.; O’Donohue, C.; Koley, A.; Bonsu, R.O.; Abboud, K.A.; Revelli, J.C.; Anderson, T.J.; McElwee-White, L., J. Am. Chem. Soc. 2014, 136, 1650–1662.
- "Low Temperature Deposition of WN_{x}C_{y} Cu Diffusion Barriers using WN(NEt_{2})_{3} as a Single-Source Precursor," O’Donohue, C.T.; McClain, K.R.; Koley, A.; Revelli, J.C.; McElwee-White, L.; Anderson, T.J., ECS J. Solid State Sci. Tech., 2015, 4, N3180-N3187.
- "Effect of Ligand Structure on Chemical Vapor Deposition of WN_{x}C_{y} Thin Films from Tungsten Nitrido Complexes of the type WN(NR_{2})_{3}," Koley, A.; O’Donohue, C.; Nolan, M.M.; McClain, K.R.; Bonsu, R.O.; Korotkov, R.Y.; Anderson, T.J., McElwee-White, L., Chem. Mater., 2015, 27, 8326−8336.
- "Photochemical CVD of Ru on Functionalized Self-Assembled Monolayers from Organometallic Precursors," Johnson, K.R.; Arevalo Rodriguez, P.; Brewer, C.R.; Brannaka, J.A.; Shi, Z.; Yang, J.; Salazar, B.; McElwee-White, L.; Walker, A.V., J. Chem. Phys., 2017, 146, 052816.
- "Understanding the Electron Stimulated Surface Reactions of Organometallic Complexes to Enable Design of Precursors for Electron Beam Induced Deposition," Spencer, J.; Rosenberg, S.; Barclay, M.; Wu, Y.-C.; McElwee-White, L.; Fairbrother, D.H., Appl. Phys. A., 2014, 117, 1631–1644.
- "Electron Induced Surface Reactions of cis-Pt(CO)_{2}Cl_{2}: a Route to Focused Electron Beam Induced Deposition of Pure Pt Nanostructures," Spencer, J.; Wu, Y.-C.; McElwee-White, L.; Fairbrother, D.H., J. Am. Chem. Soc., 2016,138, 9172– 9182.
- "Electron Induced Surface Reactions of η^{3}-Allyl Ruthenium Tricarbonyl Bromide [η^{3}-(C_{3}H_{5})Ru(CO)_{3}Br]: Contrasting the Behavior of Different Ligands," Spencer, J.; Brannaka, J.A.; Barclay, M.; McElwee-White, L.; Fairbrother, D.H., J. Phys. Chem C., 2015, 119, 15349–15359.
- "Low energy electron-induced decomposition of (η^{3}-C_{3}H_{5})Ru(CO)_{3}Br, a potential focused electron beam induced deposition precursor with a heteroleptic ligand set," Thorman, R.M.; Brannaka, J.A.; McElwee-White, L.; Ingólfsson, O., Phys. Chem. Chem. Phys.., 2017, DOI:10.1039/C7CP01696D.

== Personal life ==
McElwee-White enjoys playing the flute. She was able to perform in several concerts such as the “Lobby Concert” and the “Flute Choir Showcase” with the Gainesville Flute Ensemble in the 32nd Annual Convention of the National Flute Association in August 2004.

Another hobby that she has is horseback riding. She owns several horses on her property that she loves to ride on during her free time.

== Awards and honors ==
Her accolades include:

- 2016 UF Technology Innovator Award
- 2016 Queens University-Frost Lecturer
- 2015 Florida Award
