= General Orlov =

General Orlov may refer to:

- Alexei Grigoryevich Orlov (1737–1808), Imperial Russian Army General-in-Chief
- Alexey Fyodorovich Orlov (1787–1862), Imperial Russian Army lieutenant-general
- Vasily Petrovich Orlov (1745–1801), Imperial Russian Army general
- General Orlov (James Bond), fictional villain from the 1983 James Bond movie, Octopussy

== See also ==
- Orlov (disambiguation)
