= Oregon Graduate Institute =

Former higher education institution in Beaverton, Oregon

- Former name: Oregon Graduate Center
- Type: Private
- Established: 1963 – 2001
- Endowment: US $14.8M
- President: Edward W. Thompson
- Provost: Paul Clayton
- Academic staff: 153 (1995)
- Students: 1100 (1995)
- Undergraduates: 0
- Postgraduates: 1100
- Location: Beaverton-Hillsboro, Oregon, U.S. 45.5327°N 122.8794°W
- Campus: College town, 75 acres (30 ha)
- Website: www.ohsu.edu
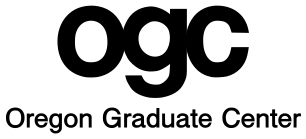

The Oregon Graduate Center was a unique, private, postgraduate-only research university in Washington County, Oregon, on the west side of Portland, from 1963 to 2001. The center was renamed the Oregon Graduate Institute in 1989. The Institute merged with the Oregon Health Sciences University in 2001, and became the OGI School of Science and Engineering within the (renamed) Oregon Health & Science University. The School was discontinued in 2008 and its campus in 2014. Demolition of the campus buildings began February 2017.

== Oregon Graduate Center ==
The Oregon Graduate Center for Study and Research (OGC) was incorporated on 2 April 1963 as a university at the behest of Gov. Mark O. Hatfield, Tektronix co-founder Howard Vollum and the City Club of Portland, with the help of $2M grant from the Tektronix Foundation. Retired physician Samuel L. Diack of the Oregon Medical Research Foundation was named the first chairman of OGC's board of trustees, and Vollum was a board member. Diack is also noted as a founder of the Oregon Museum of Science and Industry. Physicist Donald L. Benedict of the Stanford Research Institute (SRI) was hired as the first president of OGC in 1966. The original campus, a former Martin Marietta building, was located at 9430 SW Barnes Road near the intersection of Oregon Route 217 and U.S. Route 26 in an unincorporated area just north of Beaverton next to Tek's Sunset facility. Hatfield was unsuccessful in his attempt to get $1.5M in seed funding for OGC from the state legislature. Financial support was an ongoing problem for OGC, as demonstrated by the brief terms of several of its presidents. Funding in the late 1960s was received from Pacific Northwest Bell Telephone Company, and sought from the U.S. Department of Health, Education and Welfare and the National Institutes of Health. Other early backers and board members included Douglas Strain of Electro Scientific Industries (ESI), John Gray of Omark Industries Inc. and Ira Keller of Western Kraft Corporation.

A report by a committee of the Portland City Club asked, "Why does Portland lag so far behind in the great surge of science-based industry?" in 1963. At the time, metropolitan Portland had about 800,000 residents and its employment mainstays were timber and agriculture. The committee's answer to its question was, "Portland is the largest metropolitan area in the West without a full university." Portland State College (PSC), Reed College, Lewis & Clark College, the University of Portland and other halls of academe in northwestern Oregon were primarily undergraduate schools. PSC was also under pressure to become a university and a research institution, which it did in 1969 when it was renamed Portland State University (PSU). The Portland interests were competing with the University of Oregon (U of O) in Eugene and Oregon State University (OSU) in Corvallis for research funding.

Tektronix ("Tek"), the largest private employer in Oregon from the 1960s through the 1980s, was quoted, "...the creation of a graduate center 'an absolute necessity' for its operations because 'we find it extremely difficult to attract competent people to our plant, and we find those who have acquired with us a degree of scientific competence often leave us for the specific reason that they do not find here further help or stimulation to their scientific development. Tektronix stated that it would have to establish research and development facilities elsewhere near universities if a graduate training and research center was not founded in Portland." Tek encouraged employees to pursue advanced degrees and sometimes provided financial support. Tek started an in-house continuing education program in the late 1950s that rivaled the local community colleges in size.

Benedict's vision for OGC was based on the European model of research for a civilian-based economy, rather than a wartime economy as was common in the United States. Benedict liked the Oxford University tutorial system in the United Kingdom and the Technische Hochschule network in West Germany. Benedict had been in charge of SRI's European operations before he was hired by OGC.

The first six faculty—all chemists—and staff were hired in 1966, and the first students were admitted in 1969. Carl Miller, a structural engineer, was the first staff member hired, and laser expert J. Richard Kerr was the second. OGC moved to a newly developed 74-acre site at 20000 NW Walker Road on the Hillsboro-Beaverton boundary in August 1969, which was intended to be its permanent campus, adjacent to the Oregon National Primate Research Center. The new site had been the Donovan family's wheat farm. Both campuses used Portland mailing addresses, although neither is in Portland proper. The initial programs were in chemistry, physics and mathematics, without any departmental divisions. OGC had no undergraduates, dormitories, sororities, fraternities, student-athletes, mascots, Latin motto, homecoming parade or social science departments, ever. The first research project was a study of the propagation of laser beams through the atmosphere by Kerr.

The first master's degree was awarded to Terry D. Lee in organic chemistry in 1971, and the first doctor of philosophy to Paul M. Perry in applied physics in 1973. All programs were accredited by the Northwest Association of Schools and Colleges. In 1979, OGC had 23 faculty and 33 students. By 1988, OGC had 48 faculty members, all untenured, and 150 students. The purpose of OGC was to provide training, research and graduate credentials pertinent to Silicon Forest and other local industries, without the bureaucracy and politics of a conventional university, somewhat similar to Rockefeller University.

=== Original board of directors ===
The original board of trustees of OGC was Harry Alpert (U of O), Henry Cabell, Vernon Cheldelin (OSU), Arno H. Denecke, S.L. Diack (chairman), physicist Walter P. Dyke (Linfield College, Field Emission Corp.), Gerald W. Frank (Governor's Advisory Committee), educator James T. Marr, Harold M. Phillips, Donald E. Pickering (OHSU), G. Herbert Smith (Willamette University), Willard B. Spalding (dean of PSC), Richard H. Sullivan (president of Reed College), metallurgist R.H. "Rudy" Thielemann (Martin Marietta Metals Co.), C. H. Vollum and Harry White.

=== Presidential eras ===
Donald L. Benedict was originally hired as a consultant to Gov. Hatfield's committee. Benedict favored theoretical or pure research, as opposed to the applied research favored by most of the industrialists and philanthropists on the committee. His major accomplishment was acquiring the new campus on Walker Road from Tektronix Foundation, where the first new building was dedicated on 15 August 1969. Cost overruns resulted in his dismissal by the trustees just 12 days after the dedication.

E. Robert de Luccia, a Pacific Power & Light Co. executive and board member became interim president in 1969, following Benedict's dismissal. De Luccia had been a trustee from 1968 to 1972. OGC had to borrow money to meet the payroll and pay contractors for new buildings. Mergers with Lewis & Clark College and PSU and a takeover by Tek were proposed, and most OGC employees were looking for other jobs. De Luccia left OGC for a job in the Nixon administration in Southeast Asia in June 1971, and the original OGC facility on Barnes Road was sold for $350k that year. De Luccia was named a Life Trustee of OGI in 1990 for his longtime support.

Arthur F. Scott (1898-1982), a provost of OGC and former chemistry professor and president (1942 to 1945) at Reed College, was appointed acting president in 1971–1972. Negotiations with PSU failed to produce a merger, a request for $1.5M in operating funds from the state legislature was denied, and OGC was on the brink of extinction during this time. The chemistry building at Reed is named for Scott.

Western Kraft Corp. founder Ira C. Keller (1899-1978) was appointed president in 1972. His business approach kept OGC afloat, and brought full accreditation in 1973. Applied physics professor Lynwood W. Swanson and partners incorporated FEI Company in 1973, although Swanson remained on the faculty at OGC until 1987. The National Institutes of Health, National Science Foundation and Weyerhauser Co. all made generous grants to OGC during Keller's tenure. Keller retired as president in 1977 and became chairman of the board of trustees upon Diack's retirement. The Keller Fountain Park in downtown Portland was named in honor of Ira Keller for his philanthropy and civic involvement, and Keller Auditorium for his son Richard B. Keller. Western Kraft began as a joint venture between the Willamette Valley Lumber Co. and Santiam Lumber Co. in 1954, and merged with Willamette Industries Inc. in 1973. The younger Keller was a trustee of OGC from 1984 to 1987.

J. Richard "Dick" Kerr, a professor of electrical engineering at PSC and OGC and later the executive vice-president of OGC, was promoted to president in 1977. Kerr, a laser expert, was hired by OGC as a researcher in 1966. He resigned in 1979 amid more financial crises and controversy with the faculty over cutbacks. The Jack Murdock Research Laboratory, housing the physics and electrical engineering programs and funded by a $2M grant by the M.J. Murdock Charitable Trust, opened in 1978 as the third building on the OGC campus. After OGC, Kerr was an executive at Flight Dynamics Inc. and FLIR Systems Inc., and founded Max-Viz Inc. in Portland.

Electrical engineer F. Paul Carlson was hired by OGC as the vice-president for development in 1977 in the midst of a financial crisis, and became acting president in 1979. OGC purchased 100 acres of land adjacent to its 77-acre campus in 1980, and Carlson was elected president of the center. The additional land became the Science Park in 1982, a site for start-up companies intended as an endowment for OGC. Planar Systems, a Tek spin-off, began developing flat-panel displays there in 1984. Ground was broken for the Samuel L. Diack Memorial Library in 1979, and the building was completed in 1980, named in honor of the first chairman. The Computer Science building was completed in 1981, with Richard B. Kieburtz coming from State University of New York at Stony Brook to head the new department. Jacqueline Jackson, coordinator of a gifted education program in Portland Public Schools (Oregon), started the Saturday Academy, a science program for high school students at OGC and other area campuses, in May 1983. Vollum was awarded OGC's first honorary doctor of science degree in 1984. Carlson retired as academic president of OGC, and became president of the Oregon Graduate School Corporation and chairman of the OGC board of trustees in 1985. The OGC Corp. was formed to be the developer and landlord for Science Park after the withdrawal of Rembold Corp. The Science Park was intended to provide, in the form of an estimated $4M annual rent from tenants, the endowment that OGC sorely needed for its survival. Planar Systems was the first tenant, in August 1983. A campus quarterly magazine, Visions, was begun in the spring of 1985, with historian Norman R. Eder as its managing editor and Georgiana Johnsrud as editor. The circulation of Visions reached a peak of ~15,000. Prolific author Lawrence E. Murr was a professor of MS&E and the vice-president for academic affairs during Carlson's term. Carlson returned briefly in 1986 as acting president of OGC upon Kahne's departure, then resigned as chairman of the board and took a job with Honeywell.

Stephen J. Kahne (1937- ), an electrical engineer and dean of engineering at Rensselaer Polytechnic Institute (RPI), served as president of OGC in 1985–1986. Before RPI, he was a professor at the University of Minnesota and Case Western Reserve University, directed a division of the National Science Foundation, and was president of the IEEE Control Systems Society in 1981. Vollum, upon his death in 1986, bequeathed $14.8M to OGC, which became OGC's first endowment. Kahne worked for the MITRE Corp. and Embry Riddle Aeronautical University after leaving OGC. Lawyer Monford Orloff served as chairman of the board of OGC circa 1986.

James J. Huntzicker was hired by OGC as a professor of atmospheric chemistry in 1974. He served as acting president from 1986 to 1988. The Oregon Institute for Advanced Computing opened in 1988 on the OGC campus, intended to be the SEMATECH of parallel computing. Huntzicker stayed on as a professor at OGC, and joined OHSU in 2001 when OGI merged with OHSU. He became Head of the Department of Management in Science & Technology in 2004, which became the Division of Management in the OHSU School of Medicine. As head of the Division of Management he co-led the development of the OHSU-PSU MBA in Healthcare Management in the School of Medicine. He is a former chairman of the board of directors for Saturday Academy.

Dwight A. Sangrey, a professor of civil engineering at Cornell University and Carnegie Mellon University and dean of engineering at RPI, was hired by OGC as president in 1988, "with a mandate to increase significantly the size of OGC's faculty and student body." OGC was renamed OGI in 1989. Sangrey was awarded the State-of-the-Art Civil Engineering Award by ASCE in 1990 for a paper on the reliability of offshore foundations such as oil rigs. FEI Company moved into Science Park circa 1990, but relocated to its present headquarters in Hillsboro in 1992. The 65,000-ft^{2} Cooley Science Center, the first new laboratory building on campus since 1983, was completed in 1993. Sangrey left in 1994, and was hired as an administrator by Pacific University in 2009.

Paul E. Bragdon, a lawyer and president of Reed College 1971–1988, was succeeded Sangrey in 1994, and took on the task of rescuing OGI from a $2M deficit. Bragdon had been a member of the OGI board of trustees. He retired in 1998, but served as an interim president of Lewis & Clark College in 2004–2005. He was awarded an honorary D.Sc. by OHSU in 2004. OGI reported 448 employees in 1994. A master's degree in management in Science and Technology, in conjunction with Willamette University's Atkinson Graduate School of Management, was launched in late 1994 in a ceremony attended by U.S. Senator Mark Hatfield.

Paul Clayton, a professor of materials science and engineering and the campus provost, served briefly as an interim president in 1998 after Bragdon's departure. Clayton's research included tribology and wear, in addition to his administrative duties.

The last president, Edward W. Thompson came to OGI in 1998 from HRL Laboratories, where he led a team of 40 researchers developing technology for defense contracting, telecommunications and space. Thompson became the dean of the OGI School of Science and Engineering and a vice-president of OHSU after the merger in 2001.

== Oregon Graduate Institute ==
The name of OGC was changed on 1 November 1989 to the Oregon Graduate Institute of Science & Technology (OGI), on Dwight Sangrey's watch. Sangrey foresaw an education-business complex for OGI similar to Research Triangle Park in North Carolina. By 1995, OGI had grown to 153 full-time and adjunct faculty members and 1100 students in full-time, part-time and continuing education enrollment, in six departments. Edward H. Cooley (1922-2000), founder and retired chairman of Precision Castparts Corporation, was the chairman of the board of trustees. The board also included executives from ESCO Corporation, Planar Systems Inc., Tektronix, Intel Corp. and ESI Inc. The board adopted a mission statement: "Oregon Graduate Institute of Science & Technology, the only private graduate school of science and engineering in the Pacific Northwest, educates leaders and creates knowledge through research." The annual budget was $14M, consisting of 9% from tuition, 8% from annual giving, 8% from endowments, 68% from government and industrial research grants, and 6% from other sources.

| Department | Research Specialties |
|---|---|
| Chemistry, Biochemistry and Molecular Biology | lignin, wood-decay fungus, chelation by siderophores, membranes, liposomes, pichia pastoris, |
| Computer Science and Engineering | speech recognition, parallel computing, artificial intelligence |
| Electrical Engineering and Applied Physics | focused ion beam, gallium arsenide, lanthanum hexaboride, liquid metal ion sources, micromachining, diode lasers, SiC semiconductors |
| Environmental Science and Engineering | atmospheric physics, groundwater |
| Management in Science and Engineering | |
| Materials Science and Engineering (MS&E) | electroslag welding, capacitor-discharge welding, railroad tribology, analytical transmission electron microscopy, partnership with Edison Welding Institute, superconductivity, high-strain-rate phenomena |

The original faculty members, most of whom were recruited by Benedict, were honored at the 1990 commencement. They were: Harlan U. Anderson, Robert L. Autrey, Douglas F. Barofsky, Edward J. Baum, Warren E. Budden-baum, G. Doyle Daves Jr., Roger Eiss, the late Richard A. Elliott, Stephen Fisk, George A. Gray, James K. Hurst, J. Richard Kerr, George G. Lendaris, Thomas M. Loehr, Hans Oesterreicher, George P. O'Leary, David K. Roe, Erwin Rudy and Gerald J. Throop. The graduating class of 34 students consisted of 24 master's degrees and ten doctorates.

OGI's most popular degree in 2001 was management in science and technology. At the doctorate level, the most popular degree was in computer science and engineering. The least popular degrees were in biochemistry/ molecular biology and MS&E. Non-degree programs offered by OGI included Saturday Academy, an Applied Mathematics Certificate, the Solid State Devices Consortium, and short courses under the Center for Professional Development umbrella. OGC was a partner in the Oregon Center for Advanced Technology Education, created by Gov. Victor Atiyeh in 1985 in conjunction with PSU, OSU and U of O. OGI quickly became very competitive with other Oregon universities in research and graduate degrees in STEM fields. In 1995, OGI conferred 77 master's degrees and 26 doctorates, compared to 218 and 26 for the U of O, OSU and PSU combined.

| Year | Faculty | Students |
|---|---|---|
| 1969 | 12 | 5 |
| 1979 | 23 | 33 |
| 1984 | 33 | 85 |
| 1988 | 48 | 150 |
| 1991 | 125 | 800 |
| 1995 | 153 | 1100 |

=== Merger with OHSU ===
OGI considered mergers with OSU and PSU in the late 1990s, but the 90-mile distance of OSU in Corvallis and the large-public-university nature of both OSU and PSU were deterrents. The OGI board squelched a proposed merger with OSU in 2000. OGI merged with the Oregon Health Sciences University (OHSU) in July 2001, with OGI becoming the OGI School of Science and Engineering, one of four Schools within OHSU. OGI president Ed Thompson became the dean of the school. The enlarged OHSU was slightly renamed the Oregon Health & Science University. Although OHSU is the state medical school, it had become a public corporation in 1995; this was closer to OGI's business model than either OSU or PSU. The MS&E department moved to downtown Portland and became part of PSU's mechanical engineering department in 2001. Fragments of other departments also moved to PSU. The OHSU-OGI merger was funded in part by a $4M grant from the M.J. Murdock Charitable Trust, an organization started by Vollum's partner at Tektronix, Jack Murdock. The award was earmarked to help launch a new biomedical engineering program at OGI SS&E.

=== Presidents ===
- Donald L. Benedict, physicist, 1966-1969
- E. Robert de Luccia, 1969-1971
- Arthur F. Scott, chemist, 1971-1972
- Ira C. Keller, engineer, 1972-1977
- J. Richard Kerr, electrical engineer, 1977-1979
- F. Paul Carlson, electrical engineer, 1979-1985
- Stephen J. Kahne, electrical engineer, 1985-1986
- James J. Huntzicker, chemist, 1986-1988
- Dwight A. Sangrey, civil engineer, 1988-1994
- Paul E. Bragdon, lawyer, 1994-1998
- Paul Clayton, metallurgical engineer, 1998
- Edward W. Thompson, 1998-2001

=== Legacy of OGI ===
OHSU sold the 40-acre OGI School of Science and Engineering campus at 20000 NW Walker Road in Hillsboro in 2007 for $44.4M, but also signed a 7-year lease for the property. The campus had 15 buildings totaling 286,000 ft^{2}. The OGI School of Science and Engineering was renamed the Department of Science & Engineering within the School of Medicine at OHSU in 2008. OHSU vacated the OGI property in 2014, and it was sold again in 2015 for $15.1M. The OGI degree programs in biochemistry, molecular biology, computer science and engineering, electrical engineering, and environmental science and engineering were moved to OHSU's Marquam Hill complex. The rest went to PSU or were discontinued. Science Park was renamed AmberGlen Business Center. The Samuel L. Diack Memorial Library closed in June 2013.

Companies that have roots at OGI include Cascade Microtech Inc. in 1983, Integra Telecom Inc. in 1984, and electron-ion microscope maker FEI Company.

First M.Sc. graduate Terry Lee earned a Ph.D. in chemistry at the U of O in 1977, and returned to OGC as a post-doctoral fellow in mass spectrometry. He was hired by the Beckmann Research Institute in California in 1982, and was working for the City of Hope National Medical Center in protein research in 1988. First Ph.D. graduate Paul Perry became a computer services manager at Western Geophysical Exploration Production in Texas.

=== Scholarly books by OGC/OGI faculty and alumni ===
- D.G. Atteridge, Advanced Nanoscale Coatings with Plasma Spray, PN, 2000.
- A.P. Black, S. Ducasse, O. Nierstrasz, D. Pollet, Squeak By Example, Square Bracket Associates, 2009, ISBN 978-3952334102.
- J.A. Cooper & Dorothy Malek, eds., Proceedings of the 1981 International Conference on Residential Solid Fuels: Environmental Impacts and Solutions, Oregon Graduate Center, 1982.
- J.M. Cregg, ed., Pichia Protocols (Methods in Molecular Biology), Second Edition, Humana Press, 2007, ISBN 978-1617375637.
- J.R. Kerr, DIY Advanced Model Railroad Signaling Electronics: Sensors, Interactivity, Track Control, CreateSpace, 2015, ISBN 978-1517602246.
- M.A.K. Khalil, ed., Atmospheric Methane: Its Role in the Global Environment, Springer, 2000, ISBN 978-3642084515.
- L.E. Murr, Interfacial Phenomena in Metals and Alloys, Addison-Wesley, 1975, ISBN 978-0201048858.
- L.E. Murr, What Every Engineer Should Know about Material and Component Failure, Failure Analysis and Litigation, Marcel Dekker, 1986, ISBN 978-0824777326.
- L.E. Murr, Electron and Ion Microscopy and Microanalysis: Principles and Applications, Second Edition, CRC Press, 1991, ISBN 978-0824785567.
- L.E. Murr, Handbook of Materials Structures, Properties, Processing and Performance, 2015 Edition, Springer, 2014, ISBN 978-3319018140.
- J.H. Orloff, L.W. Swanson & M.W. Utlaut, High Resolution Focused Ion Beams: FIB and its Applications: The Physics of Liquid Metal Ion Sources and Ion Optics and Their Application to Focused Ion Beam Technology, 2003 Edition, Kluwer Academic/Plenum Publishers, 2003, ISBN 978-0306473500.
- J.H. Orloff, ed., Handbook of Charged Particle Optics, Second Edition, CRC Press, 2009, ISBN 978-1-4200-4554-3.
- J.F. Pankow, Aquatic Chemistry Concepts, Second Edition, CRC Press, 2016, ISBN 978-1439854402.
