= Dennis A. Dougherty =

American physical organic chemist

- Born: December 4, 1952 (age 73); Harrisburg, Pennsylvania
- Education: Bucknell University B.S./M.S. (1974); Princeton University Ph.D. (1978); Yale University post-doctoral (1979)
- Awards: Richard P. Feynman Prize for Excellence in Teaching (2010); Arthur C. Cope Award (2020)
- Scientific career
- Fields: Chemistry; Neuroscience
- Workplaces: Caltech
- Academic advisors: Kurt Mislow
- Doctoral students: Lisa McElwee-White

Dennis A. Dougherty (born December 4, 1952, in Harrisburg, Pennsylvania) is the George Grant Hoag Professor of Chemistry at California Institute of Technology. His research applies physical organic chemistry to systems of biological importance. Dougherty uses various approaches to understand of the human brain, including in vivo nonsense suppression, which incorporates unnatural amino acids into ion channels for structure-function studies.

== Education ==
Dougherty received his B.S. and M.S. in 1974 from Bucknell University. Subsequently, he earned his Ph.D. in 1978 under the supervision of Kurt Mislow at Princeton University and was a post-doctoral scholar in Jerome Berson's lab at Yale University in 1979.

== Career ==
In 1979 Dougherty became a member of the Caltech faculty, earning tenure in 1985. He pioneered the investigation of the role of cation–π interactions in protein structure, molecular recognition and enzyme catalysis. He is the scientific co-founder of Neurion Pharmaceuticals, Inc. In 2005 he published a textbook entitled Modern Physical Organic Chemistry with co-author Eric V. Anslyn.

Dougherty is the recipient of multiple teaching awards including the Richard Badger Teaching Award (1992), the ASCIT Excellence in Teaching Award (1987 and 2000), and the Richard P. Feynman Prize for Excellence in Teaching (2010). In 2009, he was elected to the National Academy of Sciences.

== Selected publications ==
- Hanek, P.; Lester, A.; Dougherty, A. (Oct 2008). "A stereochemical test of a proposed structural feature of the nicotinic acetylcholine receptor" (PDF). Journal of the American Chemical Society. 130 (40): 13216–13218. Bibcode:2008JAChS.13013216H. doi:10.1021/ja8015457. ISSN 0002-7863. PMID 18781739.
- Dougherty, A. (May 2008). "Cys-loop neuroreceptors: structure to the rescue?". Chemical Reviews. 108 (5): 1642–1653. doi:10.1021/cr078207z. ISSN 0009-2665. PMID 18447378.
- Dougherty, A. (May 2008). "Physical organic chemistry on the brain" (PDF). The Journal of Organic Chemistry. 73 (10): 3667–3673. doi:10.1021/jo8001722. ISSN 0022-3263. PMID 18412391. S2CID 3206029.
- Wang, J.; Lester, A.; Dougherty, A. (Sep 2007). "Establishing an ion pair interaction in the homomeric rho1 gamma-aminobutyric acid type a receptor that contributes to the gating pathway". The Journal of Biological Chemistry. 282 (36): 26210–26216. doi:10.1074/jbc.M702314200. ISSN 0021-9258. PMID 17606618.
- Rodriguez, A.; Lester, A.; Dougherty, A. (Jun 2006). "In vivo incorporation of multiple unnatural amino acids through nonsense and frameshift suppression". Proceedings of the National Academy of Sciences of the United States of America. 103 (23): 8650–8655. Bibcode:2006PNAS..103.8650R. doi:10.1073/pnas.0510817103. ISSN 0027-8424. PMC 1482635. PMID 16728509.
- Lummis, C.; Beene, L.; Lee, W.; Lester, A.; Broadhurst, W.; Dougherty, A. (Nov 2005). "Cis-trans isomerization at a proline opens the pore of a neurotransmitter-gated ion channel" (PDF). Nature. 438 (7065): 248–252. Bibcode:2005Natur.438..248L. doi:10.1038/nature04130. ISSN 0028-0836. PMID 16281040. S2CID 4410775.
- Xiu, X.; Hanek, P.; Wang, J.; Lester, A.; Dougherty, A. (Dec 2005). "A unified view of the role of electrostatic interactions in modulating the gating of Cys loop receptors". The Journal of Biological Chemistry. 280 (50): 41655–41666. doi:10.1074/jbc.M508635200. ISSN 0021-9258. PMID 16216879.
- Dahan, S.; Dibas, I.; Petersson, J.; Auyeung, C.; Chanda, B.; Bezanilla, F.; Dougherty, A.; Lester, A. (Jul 2004). "A fluorophore attached to nicotinic acetylcholine receptor βM2 detects productive binding of agonist to the αδ site". Proceedings of the National Academy of Sciences of the United States of America. 101 (27): 10195–10200. Bibcode:2004PNAS..10110195D. doi:10.1073/pnas.0301885101. ISSN 0027-8424. PMC 454187. PMID 15218096.
- Beene, D. D.; Dougherty, D. A.; Lester, H. A. (Jun 2003). "Unnatural amino acid mutagenesis in mapping ion channel function". Current Opinion in Neurobiology. 13 (3): 264–270. doi:10.1016/S0959-4388(03)00068-0. ISSN 0959-4388. PMID 12850209. S2CID 12413271.
- Beene, D. B.; Brandt, G. S.; Zhong, W.; Zacharias, N. M.; Lester, H. A.; Dougherty, D. A. (Aug 2002). "Cation-pi interactions in ligand recognition by serotonergic (5-HT3A) and nicotinic acetylcholine receptors: the anomalous binding properties of nicotine". Biochemistry. 41 (32): 10262–10269. doi:10.1021/bi020266d. ISSN 0006-2960. PMID 12162741.
- Zhong, W.; Gallivan, J. P.; Zhang, Y.; Li, L.; Lester, H. A.; Dougherty, D. A. (Oct 1998). "From ab initio quantum mechanics to molecular neurobiology: A cation–π binding site in the nicotinic receptor". Proceedings of the National Academy of Sciences of the United States of America. 95 (21): 12088–12093. Bibcode:1998PNAS...9512088Z. doi:10.1073/pnas.95.21.12088. ISSN 0027-8424. PMC 22789. PMID 9770444.
- Ma, J. C.; Dougherty, D. A. (Aug 1997). "The Cationminus signpi Interaction". Chemical Reviews. 97 (5): 1303–1324. doi:10.1021/cr9603744. ISSN 0009-2665. PMID 11851453.
- Kearney, P. C.; Zhang, H.; Zhong, W.; Dougherty, D. A.; Lester, H. A. (Dec 1996). "Determinants of nicotinic receptor gating in natural and unnatural side chain structures at the M2 9' position". Neuron. 17 (6): 1221–1229. doi:10.1016/S0896-6273(00)80252-4. ISSN 0896-6273. PMID 8982168.
- Kearney, P. N.; Nowak, M. W.; Zhong, W.; Silverman, S. K.; Lester, H. A.; Dougherty, D. A. (Nov 1996). "Dose-response relations for unnatural amino acids at the agonist binding site of the nicotinic acetylcholine receptor: tests with novel side chains and with several agonists". Molecular Pharmacology. 50 (5): 1401–1412. doi:10.1016/S0026-895X(25)09576-8. ISSN 0026-895X. PMID 8913372.
- Dougherty, D. A.; Stauffer, D. A. (Dec 1990). "Acetylcholine binding by a synthetic receptor: implications for biological recognition". Science. 250 (4987): 1558–1560. Bibcode:1990Sci...250.1558D. doi:10.1126/science.2274786. ISSN 0036-8075. PMID 2274786. S2CID 20210121.

== Awards ==
- Camille and Henry Dreyfus Teacher-Scholar (1984–1989)
- AstraZeneca Excellence in Chemistry Award (1991)
- Arthur C. Cope Scholar Award (1992)
- Javits Neuroscience Investigator, NIH (2004)
- ACS James Flack Norris Award in Physical Organic Chemistry (2008)
- Richard P. Feynman Prize for Excellence in Teaching (2010)
- Arthur C. Cope Award (2020)

== Professional memberships ==
- Phi Beta Kappa
- American Chemical Society
- American Association for the Advancement of Science
- Biophysical Society
- Society for Neuroscience
- National Academy of Sciences (2009)
- Fellow of the American Association for the Advancement of Science (1994)
- Fellow of the American Academy of Arts and Sciences (1999)

== Personal life ==
He currently lives in South Pasadena with his wife Dr. Ellen Dougherty, the superintendent of the Lawndale Elementary School District.
