= Justin Rattner =

American businessman

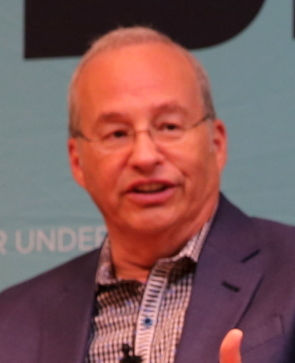
- Rattner in 2015
- Education: Cornell University (B.S. EECS, 1970; M.S. EECS, 1972)
- Scientific career
- Workplaces: Hewlett-Packard; Xerox; Intel

Justin R. Rattner is a retired Intel Senior Fellow, Corporate Vice President and former director of Intel Labs. Previously, he served as the corporation's Chief Technology Officer, where he was responsible for leading Intel's microprocessor, communications and systems technology labs and Intel Research.

In 1989, Rattner was named Scientist of the Year by R&D Magazine for his leadership in parallel and distributed computer architecture. In December 1996, Rattner was featured as Person of the Week by ABC World News for his visionary work on the Department of Energy ASCI Red System, the first computer to sustain one trillion operations per second (one teraFLOPS) and the fastest computer in the world between 1996 and 2000. In 1997, Rattner was honored as one of the Computing 200, the 200 individuals having the greatest impact on the U.S. computer industry today, and subsequently profiled in the book Wizards and Their Wonders from ACM Press.

Rattner has received two Intel Achievement Awards for his work in high performance computing and advanced cluster communication architecture. He was a longstanding member of Intel's Research Council and Academic Advisory Council. He previously served as the Intel executive sponsor for Cornell University on the External Advisory Board for the College of Engineering. Rattner joined Intel in 1973. He was named its first principal engineer in 1979, its fourth Intel Fellow in 1988, and one of the first four senior fellows in 2002.

Prior to joining Intel, Rattner held positions with Hewlett-Packard Company and Xerox Corporation. He received bachelor's and master's degrees from Cornell University in Electrical Engineering and Computer Science in 1970 and 1972, respectively. In 2012, Rattner was bestowed an honorary Doctor of Science from Willamette University in Salem, Oregon, where he delivered the commencement address to the Atkinson Graduate School of Management (AGSM).

Rattner lives near Portland, Oregon where he and his three children own and operate a large equestrian competition and training facility.

== Honors/Achievements ==
- Awarded Honorary Doctor of Science by Willamette University, May 2012
- ABC World News Person of the Week, December 1996
- World's Fastest Computers 1996-2000
- R&D Magazine Scientist of the Year 1989
- Received two Intel Achievement Awards
- Globe Award by the Oregon Center for Advanced Technology Education 1989

== Patents ==
- US 4803622 Programmable I/O sequencer for use in an I/O processor, 7 February 1989
- US 4402046 Interprocessor communication system, 30 August 1983
- US 4387427 Hardware scheduler/dispatcher for data processing system, 7 June 1983
- US 4325120 Data processing system, 13 April 1982
