= Image destriping =

Image processing task

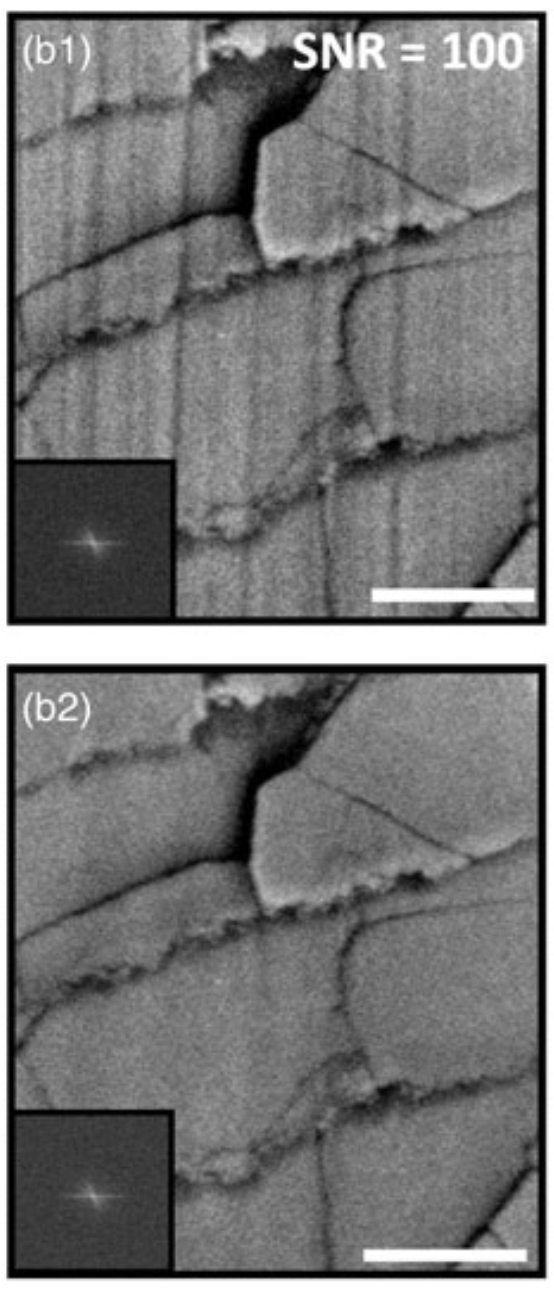
Image destriping using the Schwartz-Hovden destripe algorithm. Scale bar 2 μm.

Image destriping is the process of removing stripes or streaks from images and videos without disrupting the original image/video. These artifacts plague a range of fields in scientific imaging including atomic force microscopy, light sheet fluorescence microscopy, and planetary satellite imaging.

The most common image processing techniques to reduce stripe artifacts is with Fourier filtering. Unfortunately, filtering methods risk altering or suppressing useful image data. Methods developed for multiple-sensor imaging systems in planetary satellites use statistical-based methods to match signal distribution across multiple sensors. More recently, a new class of approaches leverage compressed sensing, to regularize an optimization problem, and recover stripe free images. In many cases, these destriped images have little to no artifacts, even at low signal to noise ratios.
