= Liquid metal ion source =

A liquid metal ion source (LMIS) is an ion source which uses metal that is heated to the liquid state and used to form an electrospray to form ions. An electrospray Taylor cone is formed by the application of a strong electric field and ions are produced by field evaporation at the sharp tip of the cone, which has a high electric field. Ions from a LMIS are used in ion implantation and in focused ion beam instruments. Typically gallium is preferred for its low melting point, low vapor pressure, its relatively unreactive nature, and because the gallium ion is sufficiently heavy for ion milling.

== Development ==
The LMIS technique originated in the development of colloid thruster spacecraft propulsion systems. Research beginning in the early 1960s showed that liquid metal can generate large numbers of ions. By the early 1970s, these results spawned the development of LMIS ion microprobes. Initially, in the development of this technique, the liquid metal was supplied by a capillary tube. This method can be difficult to control at low emission currents. The technique of "blunt-needle" LMIS was discovered by accident in the early 1970s. For this method a thin-film of liquid metal is allowed to flow to the apex of a sharp needle.

== Focused ion beam ==
Most focused ion beam instruments use a liquid-metal ion sources (LMIS) often with gallium. In a gallium LMIS, gallium metal is placed in contact with a tungsten needle and heated gallium wets the tungsten and flows to the tip of the needle where the opposing forces of surface tension and electric field produce the cusp shaped Taylor cone. The tip radius of this cone is ~2 nm. The electric field at this small tip is typically greater than 1 × 10^{8} V/cm and causes ionization and field emission of the gallium atoms. The ions are then accelerated to an energy of 1–50 keV and focused onto the sample with electrostatic lenses. LMIS produces a high current density ion beam with a small energy spread and can deliver tens of nanoamperes of current to a sample with a spot size of a few nanometers.
