= Jon Orloff =

American physicist, author and professor (born 1942)

Jonathan Harris Orloff (born 1942) is an American physicist, author and professor. Born in New York City, he is the eldest son of Monford Orloff and brother of pianist Carole Orloff and historian Chester Orloff. Orloff is known for his major fields of research in charged particle optics, applications of field emission processes, high-brightness electron and ion sources, focused ion and electron beams and their applications for micromachining, surface analysis and microscopy and instrumentation development for semiconductor device manufacturing.

== Career ==
Orloff received his B.S. in physics from M.I.T. in 1964 and a Ph.D. in applied physics from the Oregon Graduate Center in 1977.

Between degrees, he did experimental nuclear physics at the University of Pittsburgh, and worked for a small company beginning in 1970 that was attempting to market a transmission electron microscope with electrostatic lenses.

The TEM venture was unsuccessful and abandoned in 1973. The interest Orloff developed in electron optics led him to pursue a Ph.D. at OGC in 1974, under the aegis of Lynwood W. Swanson. From 1978 to 1985 he was an associate professor of applied physics at the Oregon Graduate Center, and a consultant to the Hughes Research Laboratories.

He was a full professor in the Department of Applied Physics and Electrical Engineering from 1984 to 1993. In the summer of 1985 he went to France as a visiting scientist by invitation, of CNRS Laboratoire de Microstructures et Microelectronique in Bagneux. During his time at OGC he developed high resolution focused ion beam (FIB) technology, and did optics design for FEI Company, of which he was the fourth partner, and where he also sat on the board of directors.

His father Monford Orloff was chairman of FEI until his retirement in 1997. Orloff was a professor at the University of Maryland, College Park in the Department of Electrical and Computer Engineering from 1993 until his retirement in 2006. He has authored or co-authored more than 80 publications, including a Scientific American article and the books Handbook of Charged Particle Optics, of which he is the editor, and High Resolution Focused Ion Beams, with L.W. Swanson and M.W. Utlaut. He is Professor Emeritus at the University of Maryland at College Park.

== Organizational affiliations ==
- Advisory Committee of the Electron, Ion Photon Beam and Nanotechnology Conference, of which he was previously conference chair
- Institute of Electrical and Electronics Engineers
- American Association for the Advancement of Science

== Awards ==
- National Science Foundation Presidential Young Investigator Award in Physics (1984).
- IBM Corporation Grant for Excellence in Electron Optics (1983).
- Fellow, I.E.E.E. (2001)
- Fellow, A.A.A.S. (2001)

== Bibliography of major publications ==
- Orloff, Jon; Swanson, L.W.; Utlaut, M. (1996). "Fundamental limits to imaging resolution for focused ion beams". Journal of Vacuum Science & Technology B: Microelectronics and Nanometer Structures. 14 (6). American Vacuum Society: 3759. Bibcode:1996JVSTB..14.3759O. doi:10.1116/1.588663. ISSN 0734-211X.
- Wang, Li; Orloff, Jon; Tang, Tiantong (1995). "Study of space-charge devices for focused ion beam systems". Journal of Vacuum Science & Technology B: Microelectronics and Nanometer Structures. 13 (6). American Vacuum Society: 2414. Bibcode:1995JVSTB..13.2414W. doi:10.1116/1.588011. ISSN 0734-211X.
- Orloff, Jon (1993). "High‐resolution focused ion beams". Review of Scientific Instruments. 64 (5). AIP Publishing: 1105–1130. Bibcode:1993RScI...64.1105O. doi:10.1063/1.1144104. ISSN 0034-6748.
- Sato, M.; Orloff, J. (1992). "A new concept of theoretical resolution of an optical system, comparison with experiment and optimum condition for a point source". Ultramicroscopy. 41 (1–3). Elsevier BV: 181–192. doi:10.1016/0304-3991(92)90107-u. ISSN 0304-3991.
- Sato, M.; Orloff, J. (1991). "A method for calculating the current density of charged particle beams and the effect of finite source size and spherical and chromatic aberrations on the focusing characteristics". Journal of Vacuum Science & Technology B: Microelectronics and Nanometer Structures. 9 (5). American Vacuum Society: 2602. Bibcode:1991JVSTB...9.2602S. doi:10.1116/1.585700. ISSN 0734-211X.
- Orloff, J.; Li, J.-Z.; Sato, M. (1991). "Experimental study of a focused ion beam probe size and comparison with theory". Journal of Vacuum Science & Technology B: Microelectronics and Nanometer Structures. 9 (5). American Vacuum Society: 2609. Bibcode:1991JVSTB...9.2609O. doi:10.1116/1.585701. ISSN 0734-211X.
- J. Puretz, R. K. De Freez, R. A. Elliot, J. Orloff, and T. L. Paoli, 300 mW Operation of a Surface-Emitting Phase-Locked Array of Diode Lasers, Electronic Letters, 29 January 1987, Vol. 23, No. 3, pp. 130–131.
- Sudraud, P.; Orloff, J.; Benassayag, G. (1986). "The Effect of Carbon Bearing Gases and Secondary Electron Bombardment on a Liquid Metal Ion Source". Le Journal de Physique Colloques. 47 (C7). EDP Sciences: 381–387. doi:10.1051/jphyscol:1986765. ISSN 0449-1947. S2CID 97835058.
- Orloff, J.; Swanson, L. W. (1979). "An asymmetric electrostatic lens for field‐emission microprobe applications". Journal of Applied Physics. 50 (4). AIP Publishing: 2494–2501. Bibcode:1979JAP....50.2494O. doi:10.1063/1.326260. ISSN 0021-8979.
- Orloff, J.; Swanson, L. W. (1978). "Fine‐focus ion beams with field ionization". Journal of Vacuum Science and Technology. 15 (3). American Vacuum Society: 845–848. Bibcode:1978JVST...15..845O. doi:10.1116/1.569610. ISSN 0022-5355.
- High Resolution Focused Ion Beams: FIB and Its Applications, with L. Swanson and M. Utlaut, 2003, Springer Press, New York
- Handbook of Charged Particle Optics, CRC Press, Boca Raton 1st Ed. (1997), 2nd Ed. (2009), J. Orloff, Ed.
