= Oregon Center for Advanced Technology Education =

- Type: Public
- Active: 1985–2006
- Location: Hillsboro, Oregon, United States; 45.5273°N 122.86984°W
- Campus: Urban
- Fate: Merged into Portland State University

Oregon Center for Advanced Technology Education (OCATE) was a school in Hillsboro, Oregon, created by the state of Oregon to improve technology education. Established in 1985, the program was a collaboration of most of Oregon’s public universities. OCATE later was absorbed by Portland State University and discontinued in 2006.

== History ==
OCATE was created by the Oregon Board of Higher Education in 1985 in an effort to encourage state engineering schools to collaborate in an effort to increase high-tech education in the state. It was established with $1 million in funding provided by the Oregon Lottery and first held classes at Tektronix. Politician and businessman Tom Bruggere was one of the people credited with founding the center, and served as chairman of the group in the early 2000s. Along with the Oregon Joint Graduate Schools of Engineering, OCATE was designed to coordinate Oregon public universities’ technology education. In 1988, the state recruited the private Oregon Graduate Center to teach some of the OCATE courses. Intel scientist Justin Rattner was given OCATE’s Globe Award in 1989. OCATE merged with the Lintner Center in 1991.

The center was forced to cut 22 positions in 1992 due to statewide budget cuts. OCATE was part of a pilot project started in 1994 with a National Aeronautics and Space Administration grant to create a high-speed network linking it to Oregon Health Sciences University (OHSU), the Oregon Graduate Institute of Science and Technology) since merged with OHSU, the University of Oregon, Portland State University, and Oregon State University. The $4.5 million Nero Project would provide speeds of 155 MPS. The school moved to the Capital Center in 1995, which was a former Tektronix's facility. It began a lecture series in 1996, and converted to mostly a distance education program in 2003. The program was discontinued in 2006 and absorbed by Portland State University's School of Extended Studies. The School of Extended Studies at PSU was eliminated in 2012 and the programs under the School moved into Colleges and Schools at PSU. At that time OCATE was moved to the College of Engineering and Computer Science.

Currently the Maseeh College of Engineering and Computer Science (MCECS) offers Graduate level courses in Electrical and Computer Engineering (ECE) and Engineering and Technology Management (ETM) at PCC-Willow Creek. The courses are taught in the evening and are mainly for working professionals on the Westside. Courses are offered in technical areas that are relevant to engineers working at neighboring technology companies. Most of the courses are project-based and provide an opportunity to meet other engineers with similar interests working in related areas. Sufficient courses are offered to meet the degree requirements for our masters program without having to take time off from work during the day or having to travel to downtown Portland. Courses are offered to support both students who are and are not seeking a graduate degree.

== Details ==
OCATE’s mission statement was to “act as a facilitator, coordinator, and promoter of cooperative, world-class, graduate-level, advanced technology education. OCATE will bring together the best faculty from Oregon's public and private higher education institutions, leading industrial researchers, and out-of-state experts to provide state-of-the-art technological and business education to the advanced technology industries in Oregon.” The center was located at the Capitol Center in Hillsboro, though it had a Beaverton address.
