= Vračovice-Orlov =

- Municipality
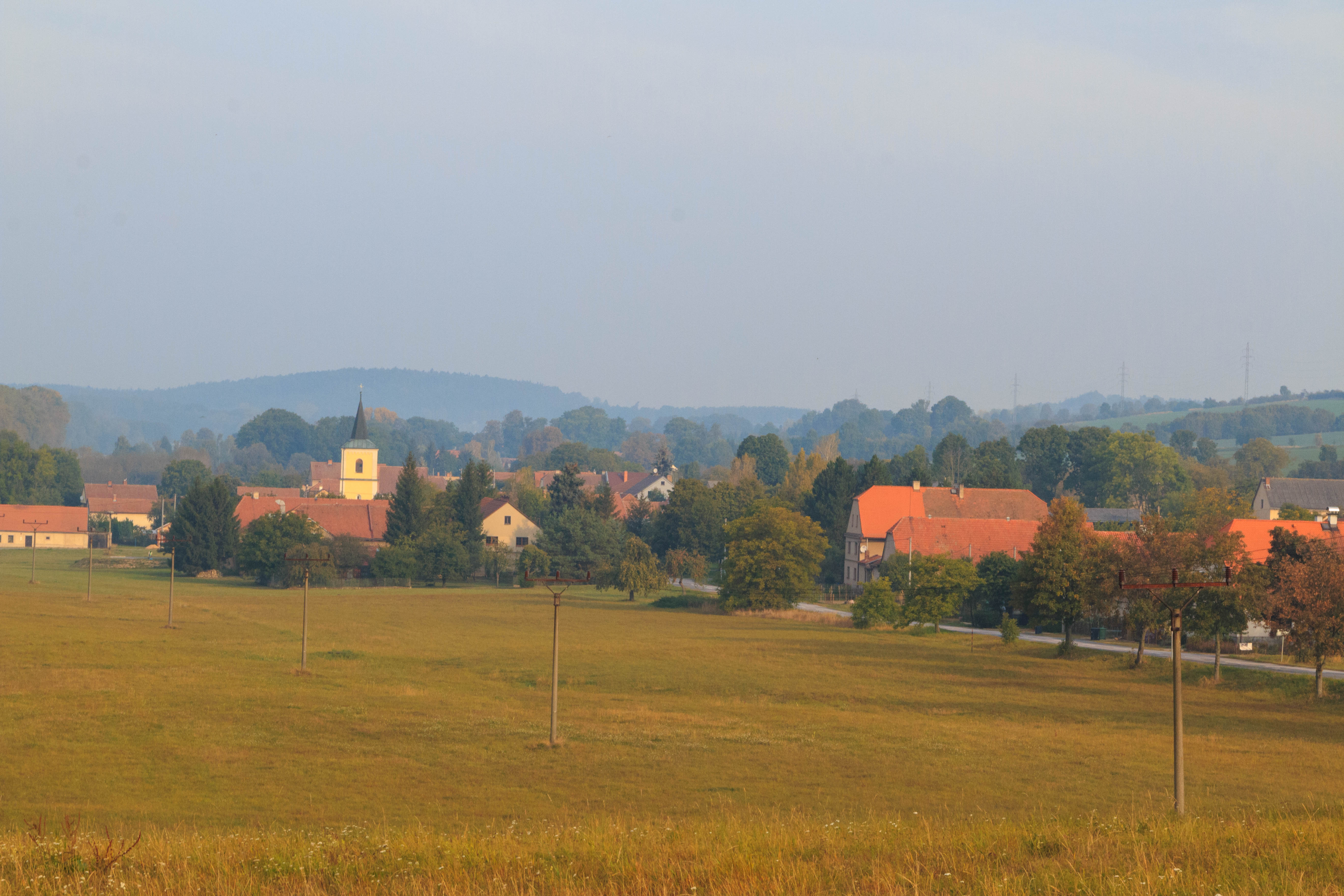
- Vračovice as seen from Orlov

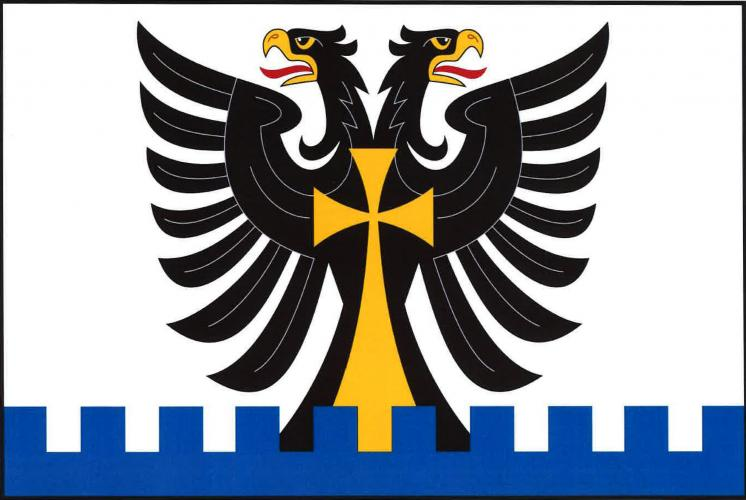
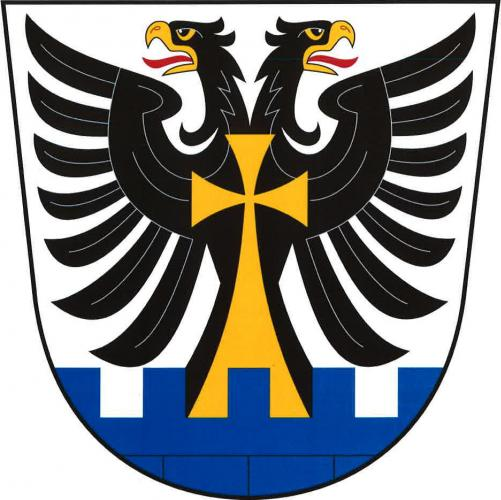
- Flag Coat of arms

- Location in the Czech Republic
- Coordinates: 49°57′9″N 16°15′8″E
- Country: Czech Republic
- Region: Pardubice
- District: Ústí nad Orlicí
- First mentioned: 1349

Area
  - Total: 2.91 km^{2} (1.12 sq mi)
- Elevation: 298 m (978 ft)

Population (2026-01-01)
  - Total: 175
  - Density: 60.1/km^{2} (156/sq mi)
- Time zone: UTC+1 (CET)
  - Summer (DST): UTC+2 (CEST)
- Postal code: 566 01
- Website: www.vracovice-orlov.cz

Vračovice-Orlov (German: Wracowitz) is a municipality in Ústí nad Orlicí District in the Pardubice Region of the Czech Republic. It has about 200 inhabitants.

Vračovice-Orlov lies approximately 11 kilometres (7 mi) west of Ústí nad Orlicí, 36 km (22 mi) east of Pardubice, and 132 km (82 mi) east of Prague.

== Administrative division ==
Vračovice-Orlov consists of two municipal parts (in brackets population according to the 2021 census):

- Vračovice (73)
- Orlov (78)

== Demographics ==
Historical population
Year	Pop.	±%
1869	342	—
1880	365	+6.7%
1890	320	−12.3%
1900	300	−6.2%
1910	310	+3.3%
1921	290	−6.5%
1930	292	+0.7%
1950	211	−27.7%
1961	199	−5.7%
1970	194	−2.5%
1980	184	−5.2%
1991	169	−8.2%
2001	152	−10.1%
2011	182	+19.7%
2021	151	−17.0%
Source: Censuses
