= Chet Orloff =

American historian

Chester Lloyd "Chet" Orloff (born February 22, 1949) is a historian, writer and professor in Portland, Oregon, called "one of [Oregon's] favorite history teachers" by The Oregonian.

== Early life ==
Orloff was born in Bellingham, Washington to business financier Monford Orloff and Janice Diamond Orloff, and raised in Washington and Portland, Oregon. His brother is physicist Jon Orloff. Orloff attended Lincoln High School, went to Boston University to prepare for law school, then transferred to the University of Oregon where he ran under legendary track coach Bill Bowerman. Orloff studied anthropology at University of Oregon, graduating in 1972 with a degree in archaeology. Orloff later received a master's degree in history and historical agency administration from Portland State University.

== Career ==
Orloff enlisted in the Peace Corps and lived and taught in Afghanistan with his wife until 1975. They returned to Portland where he interned at the Oregon Historical Society (OHS), then became assistant director from 1982 to 1986. In 1987 he left OHS and founded the Ninth Judicial Circuit Historical Society in Pasadena, California. In 1991, he returned to OHS as executive director, succeeding Bill Tramposch. He held this position for ten years, retiring at the end of 2000. Orloff was the founder and editor of the journal Western Legal History and was the Senior Editor of the Oregon Historical Quarterly.

In 2001, Orloff assembled a Columbia River maritime museum in a concourse at the Portland International Airport. It was "98 percent complete" as of the September 11 attacks, which limited visitors to ticketed passengers.

Orloff is an adjunct professor of Urban Studies and Planning at Portland State University and an instructor at the University of Oregon School of Architecture. He is also principal of Oregon History Works, a consulting firm for historical applications in design and development, president of Museum of the City and has served on the Portland Planning Commission, Portland Landmarks Commission, Regional Arts and Culture Counsel, Portland Parks Board, Center City 2035 Plan Committee, (co-chair), and other various assignments.

=== Selected publications ===
Author/editor

- Western Legal History Volume 2, Number 2, Chet Orloff, editor, 1989, Ninth Judicial Circuit Historical Society
- Portland's Public Art: A Guide and History, Norma Catherine Gleason and Chet Orloff, 1986, ISBN 0-87595-059-0
- Willamette Heights: a history, 1980
- Gifts that preserve Oregon's past for the future, 1980

Chapter and article contributions

- Museums of Cities and the Future of Cities, in Robert R. Macdonald's City Museums and City Development, 2008, ISBN 0-7591-1180-4
- If Zealously Promoted by All: The Push and Pull of Portland Parks History, in The Portland Edge: Challenges and Successes In Growing Communities, 2008, Connie Ozawa, editor, ISBN 1-55963-695-5
- Maintaining Eden: John Charles Olmsted and the Portland Park System, in Yearbook of the Association of Pacific Coast Geographers 66, 2004

== Personal life ==
Orloff lives in the Willamette Heights area of Portland. He is vocal about Portland history and politics.
