= Pumice =

Volcanic rock

- Igneous rock
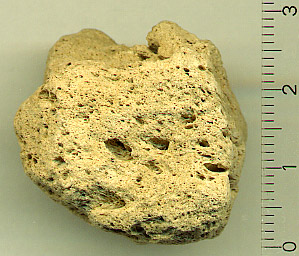
- Specimen of highly porous pumice from Teide volcano on Tenerife, Canary Islands. Density of specimen approximately 0.25 g/cm^{3}; scale in centimeters.

Composition
- Classification: Felsic to intermediate
- Primary: Volcanic glass
- Secondary: Alkali feldspar, plagioclaise feldspar, quartz, biotite, pyroxene, sanidine, zircon, anhydrite, magnetite, hornblende, olivine, and cummingtonite
- Texture: Vesicular with matrix being glassy or aphanitic, sometimes porphyritic

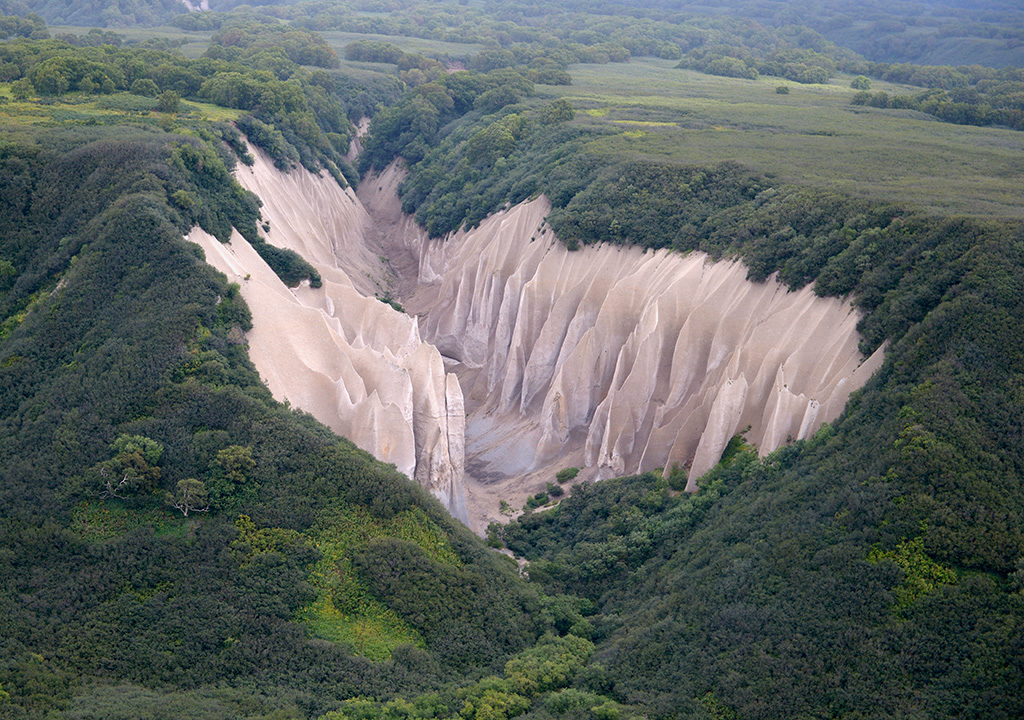
Kutkhiny Baty, a pumice rock formation outcrop located 4 km from the source of the Ozyornaya River (Lake Kurile), near the southern tip of the Kamchatka Peninsula, Russia

Pumice ( /ˈpʌmɪs/), called pumicite in its powdered or dust form, is a volcanic rock that consists of extremely vesicular rough-textured volcanic glass, which may or may not contain crystals. It is typically light-colored. Scoria is another vesicular volcanic rock that differs from pumice in having larger vesicles, thicker vesicle walls, and being dark-colored and denser.

Pumice is created when super-heated, highly pressurized rock is rapidly ejected from a volcano. The unusual foamy configuration of pumice happens because of simultaneous rapid cooling and rapid depressurization. The depressurization creates bubbles by lowering the solubility of gases (including water and CO_{2}) that are dissolved in the lava, causing the gases to rapidly exsolve (like the bubbles of CO_{2} that appear when a carbonated drink is opened). The simultaneous cooling and depressurization freeze the bubbles in a matrix. Pumice clasts are fragments of tephra that cooled in air or water. If pumice from an underwater volcanic eruption reaches the water surface, it can form pumice rafts on the water surface that can be a hazard for ships.

== Properties ==
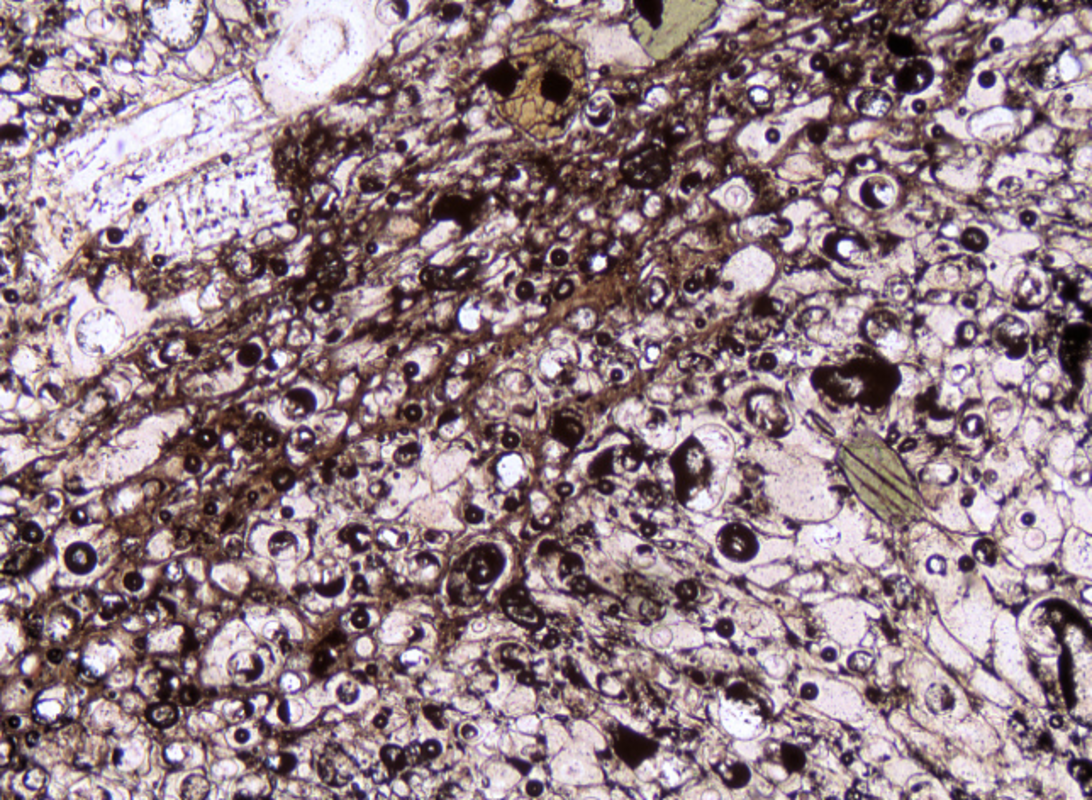
Thin section of pumice from Sinai Peninsula, Egypt

Pumice is composed of highly microvesicular volcanic glass with very thin, translucent bubble walls of pyroclastic igneous rock. It is commonly but not exclusively of silicic or felsic to intermediate in composition (e.g., rhyolitic, dacitic, andesite, pantellerite, phonolite, trachyte) but never mafic as it will be a rock called scoria or reticulite. Pumice is commonly pale in color, ranging from white, cream, blue or gray, to green-brown or black; for example, the 2021 Fukutoku-Okanoba eruption produced mostly gray pumice with small amounts (enclaves or individual clasts) of amber, brown and black pumice; the black color is caused by the presence of tiny crystals of magnetite (a black iron oxide mineral) scattered throughout the pumice. Pumice of a black color can be confused with black scoria.

Pumice forms when volcanic gases exsolving from viscous magma form bubbles that remain within the viscous magma as it cools to glass. Pumice is a common product of explosive eruptions (plinian and ignimbrite-forming) and as a byproduct of submarine (surtseyan) eruptions of intermediate to felsic composition. Pumice has a porosity of 64–85% by volume and it floats on water, possibly for years, until it eventually becomes waterlogged and sinks. Trachytic pumice from the 2021 eruption of Fukutoku-Okanoba (a submarine volcano) has a porosity ranging from 73% to 91%, with an average of 78% for floating samples and 75% for submerged samples.

There are two main forms of vesicle. Most pumice contains tubular microvesicles that can impart a silky or fibrous fabric. The elongation of the microvesicles occurs due to ductile elongation in the volcanic conduit or, in the case of pumiceous lavas, during flow. The other form of vesicles are subspherical to spherical and result from high vapor pressure during an eruption. If the vesicles run perpendicular to the length of the clast, it is typically referred to as tube pumice. It can have a close resemblance to wood. Tube pumice is also known by the terms fibrous pumice, woody pumice, and pipe pumice.

Highly vitreous pumice is considered a volcanic glass because it typically lacks a proper crystal structure. It can have a large amount of phenocrysts and/or microlites. The white pumices erupted by Pinatubo in 1991 are examples of pumice with an unusually high phenocryst content. Pumice varies in density according to the thickness of the solid material between the bubbles; many samples float in water. After the explosion of Krakatoa, pumice rafts drifted through the Indian Ocean for up to 20 years, with tree trunks floating among them. Pumice rafts disperse and support several marine species. In 1979, 1984 and 2006, underwater volcanic eruptions near Tonga created large pumice rafts that floated hundreds of kilometres to Fiji.

When larger amounts of gas are present, the result is a finer-grained variety of pumice known as pumicite. Pumicite consists of particles less than 4 mm (0.16 in) in size. Pumicite is ash-sized particles of pumice and usually forms in Plinian eruptions or other eruptions with unusually high magma fragmentation.

=== Comparison with scoria ===
Scoria differs from pumice in being typically denser. With larger vesicles and thicker vesicle walls, scoria often sinks but not always. Some scoria especially if it is unusually vesicular or has thinner walls can float for brief periods. The difference is the result of the lower viscosity of the magma that forms scoria.

Reticulite is a type of highly vesicular scoria that originates from unusually tall lava fountains (at least 300 m (980 ft) high). Reticulite contains a fragmented network of glass fibers which interlock and forming its characteristic hexagonal structure. It is formed by the depletion of the vesicle walls and the retraction of magma into threads that create the previous polygons' outlines. The glass fibers are usually of a triangular or hexagonal shape which is a sign of chilling before the vesicles could even be rounded like in other types of vesicular rocks. A synonym of it is thread-lace scoria.

== Gallery ==
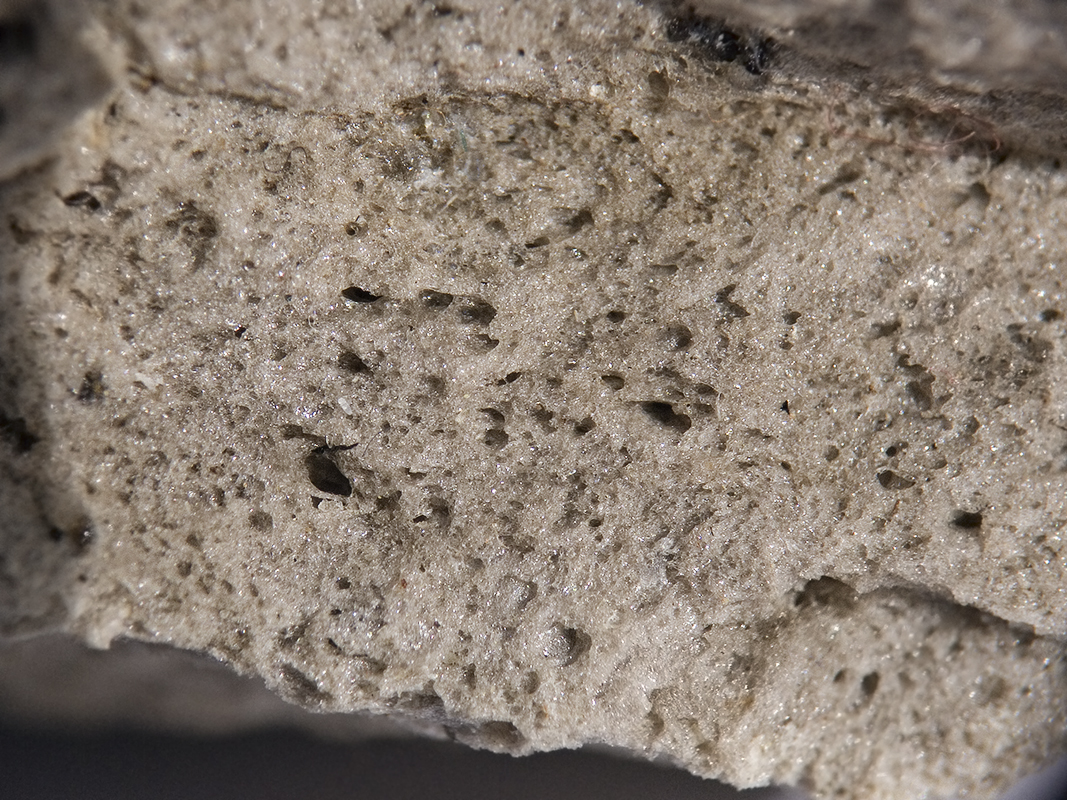
Numerous vesicles enclosed by a framework of glassy rock material, displaying the porous nature of pumice

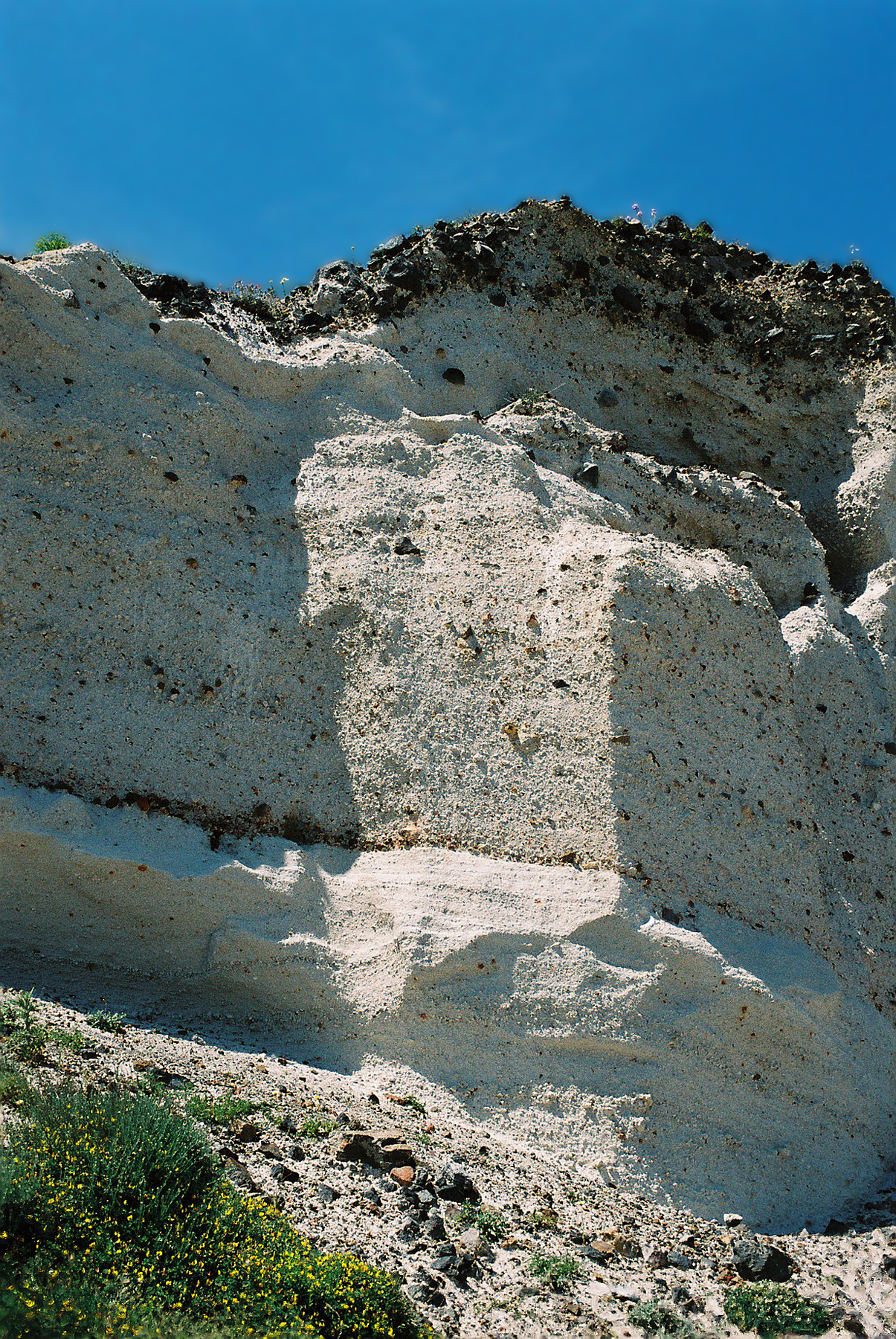
Two layers of pumice, first major phase of the Late-Bronze-Age volcano eruption (c. 1600 BC), southern part of the caldera island Thera/Santorini. The lower layer is finer-grained, almost white and without fragments of other rock types.

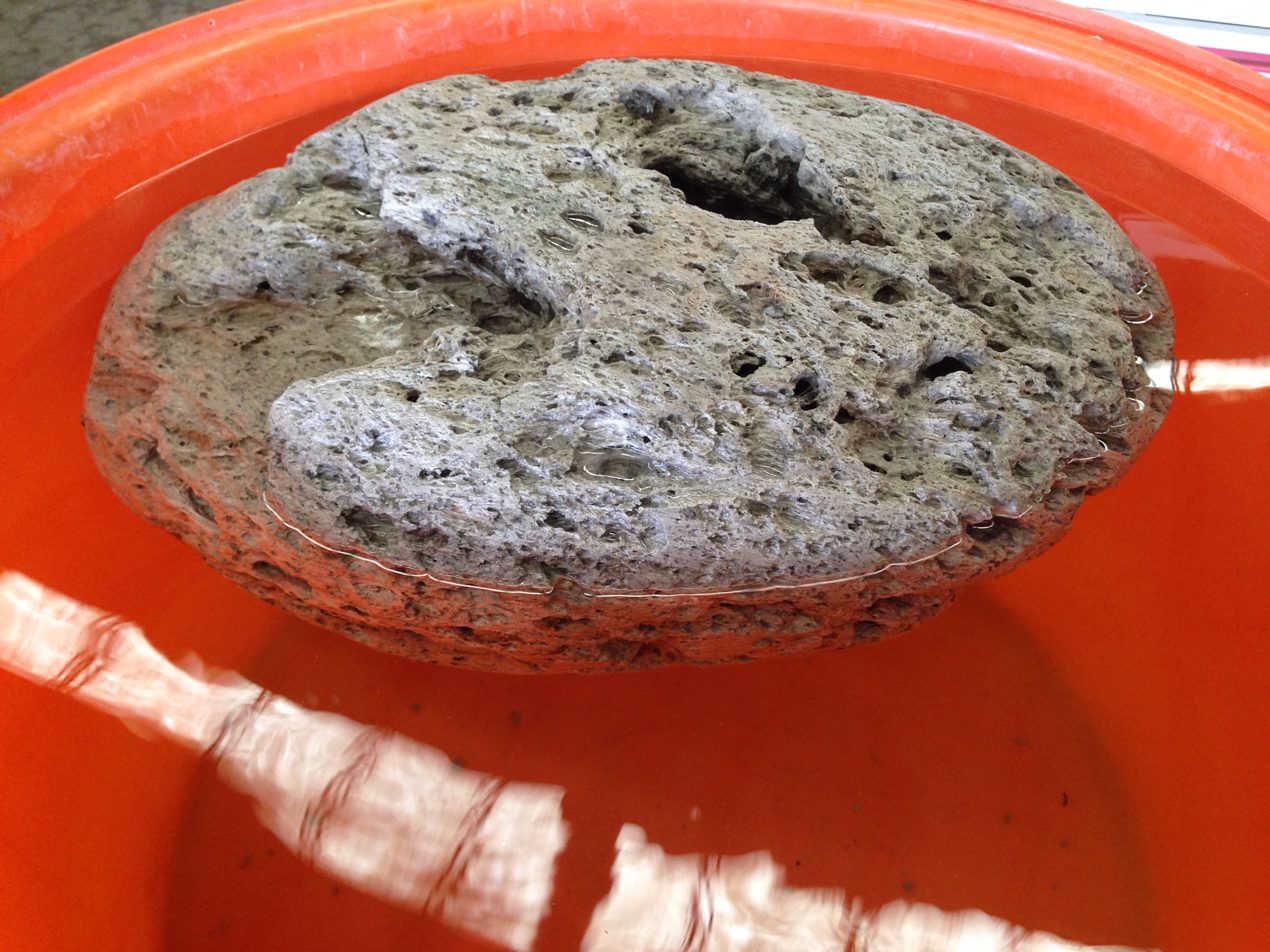
Pumice floating in water

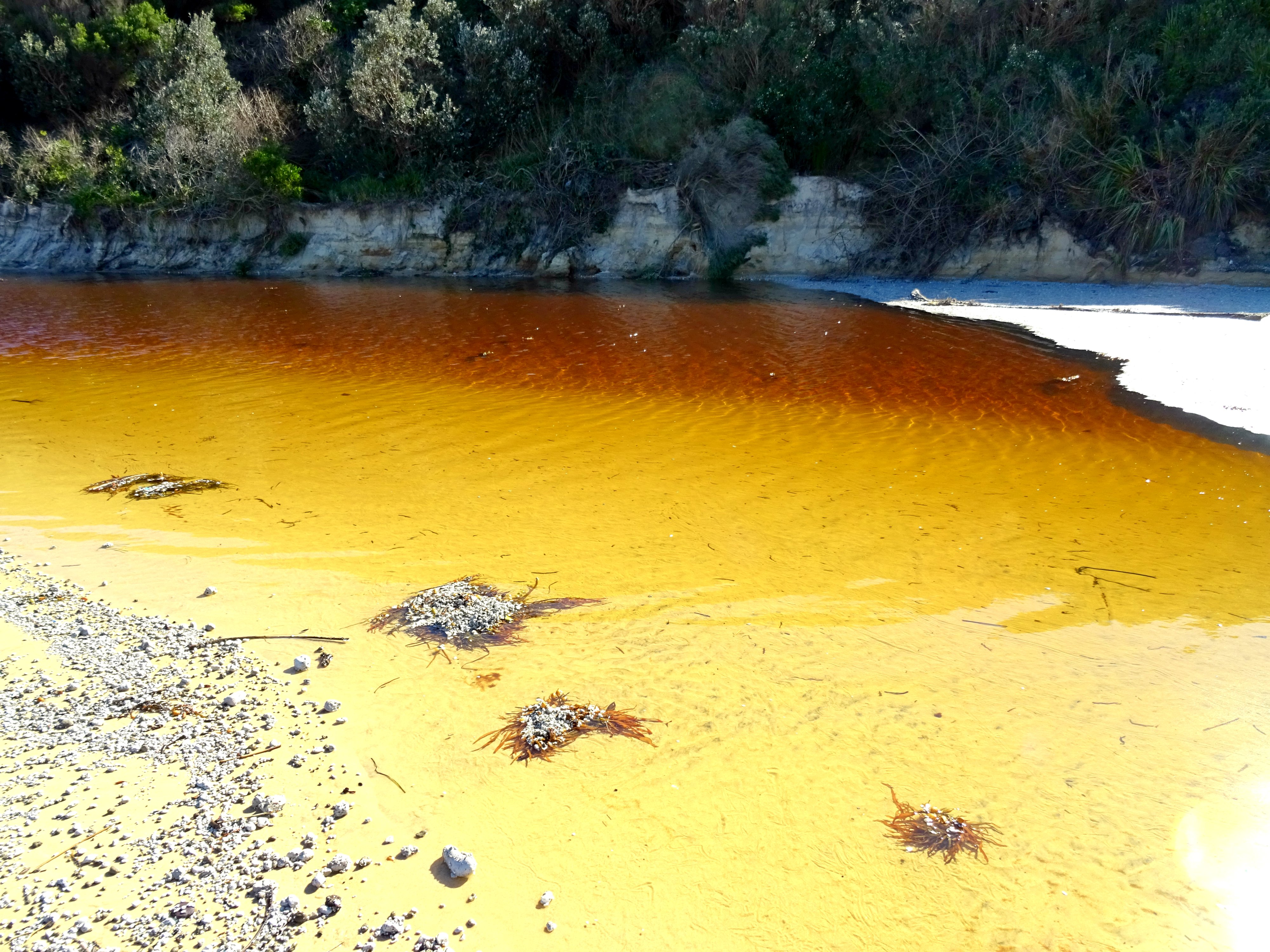
Accumulations of pumice at a beach on the southeast coast of Australia, June 2015

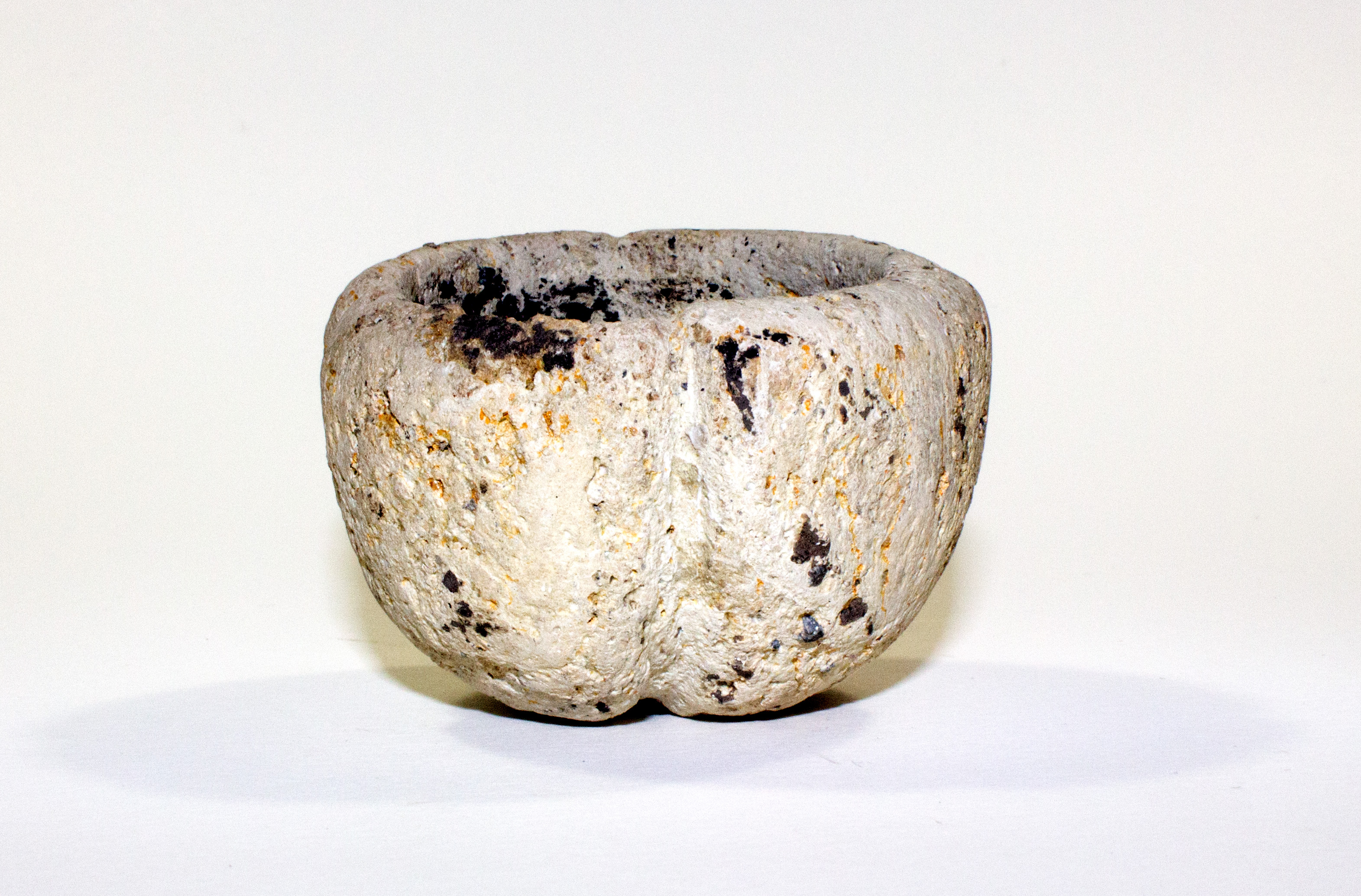
Pumice artifact from Matatoki, New Zealand

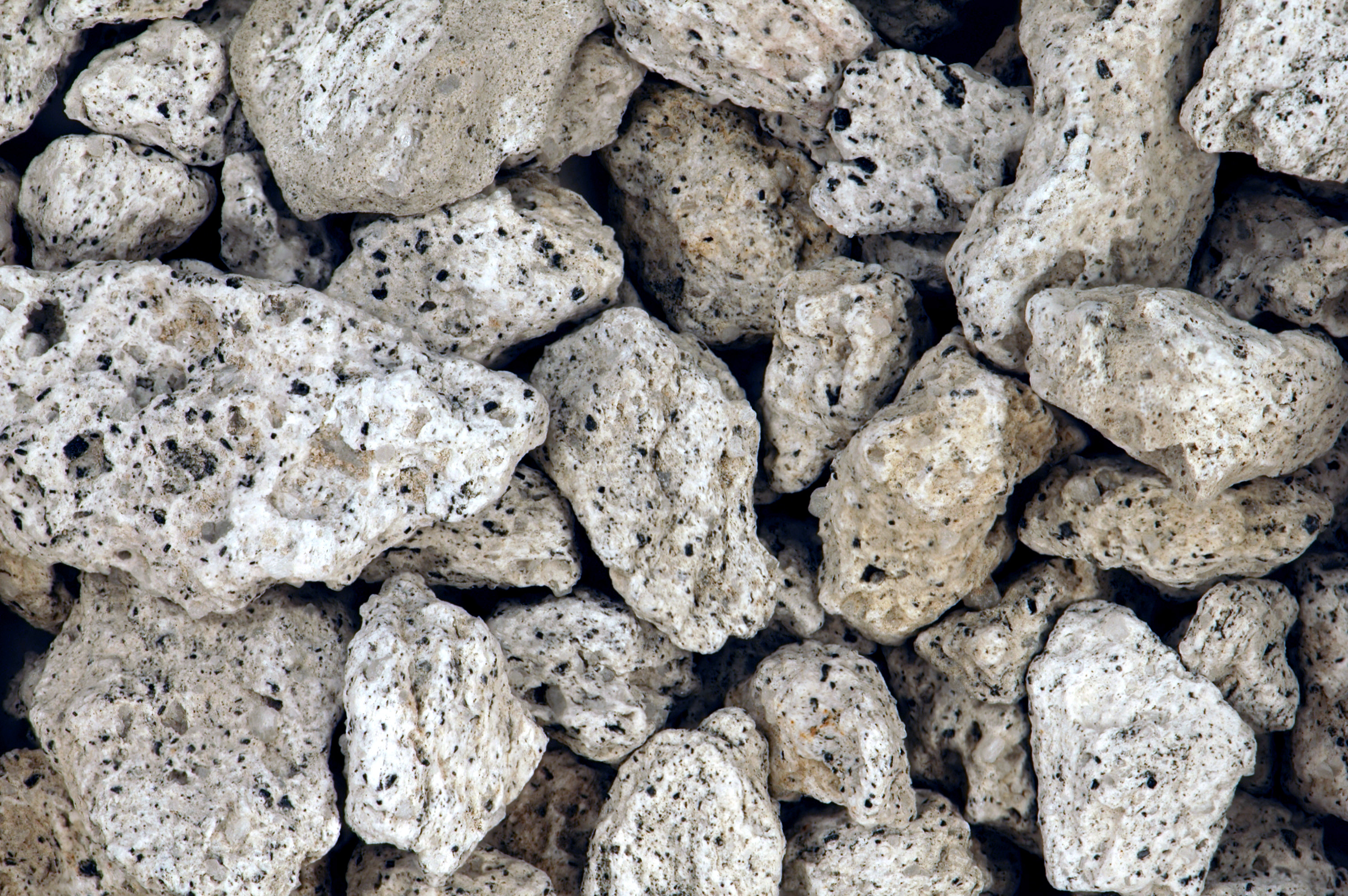
Porphyritic pumice from the June 15, 1991 eruption of Pinatubo

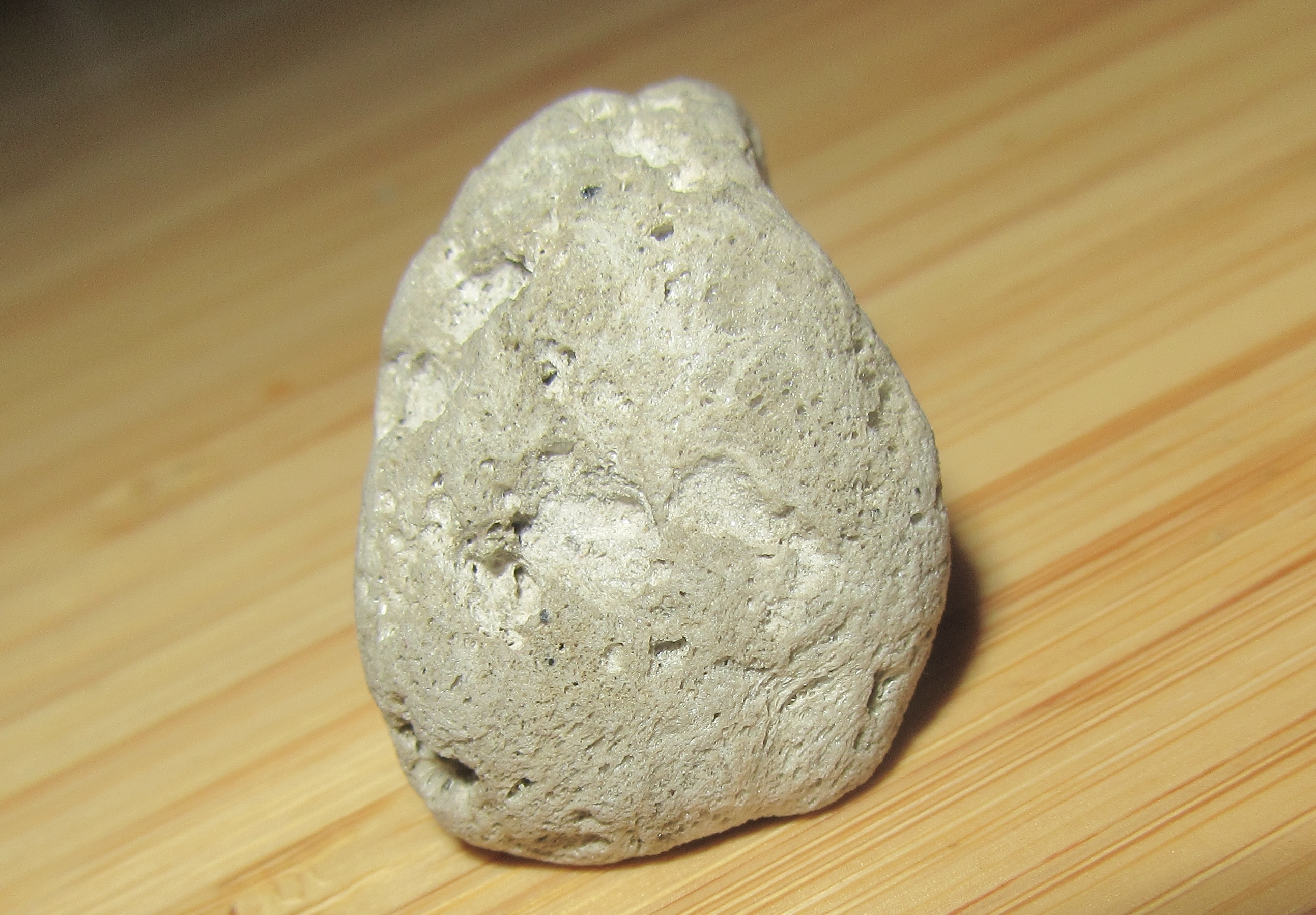
Trachytic pumice from the 2021 Fukutoku Okanoba eruption, showing exterior clast vesicularity and fibrous texture

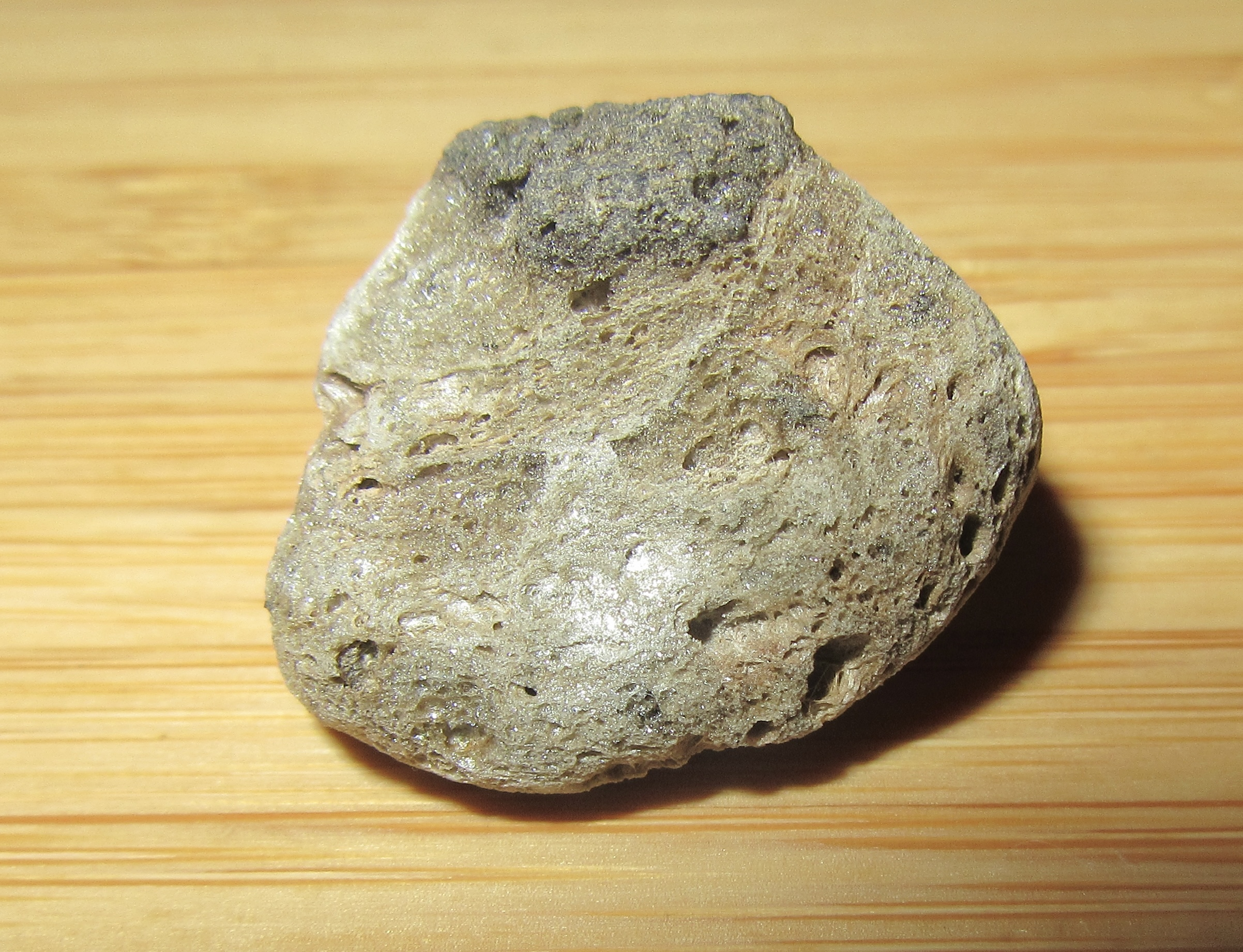
Trachytic pumice from the 2021 Fukutoku Okanoba eruption with a dark, magnetite-rich enclave within a lighter, crystal-poor glassy groundmass

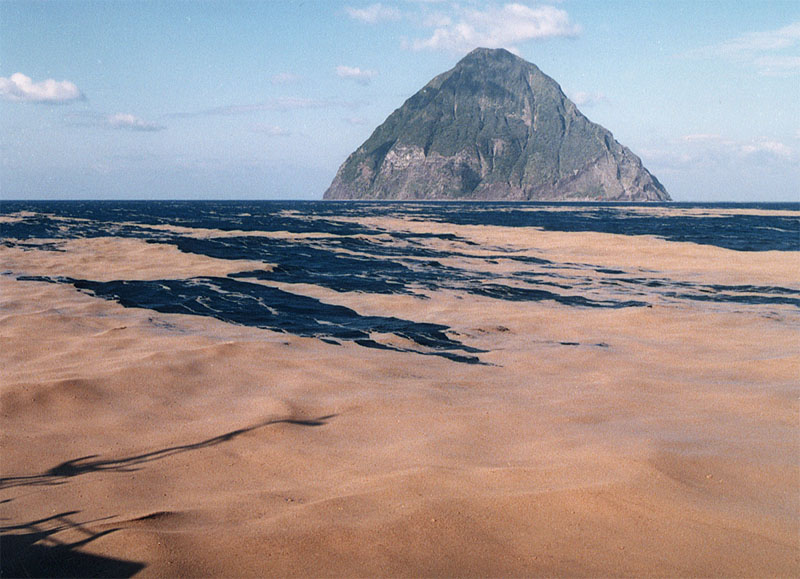
Pumice raft from Fukutoku Okanoba's eruption on January 20, 1986. South Iwo Jima can be seen in the distance.

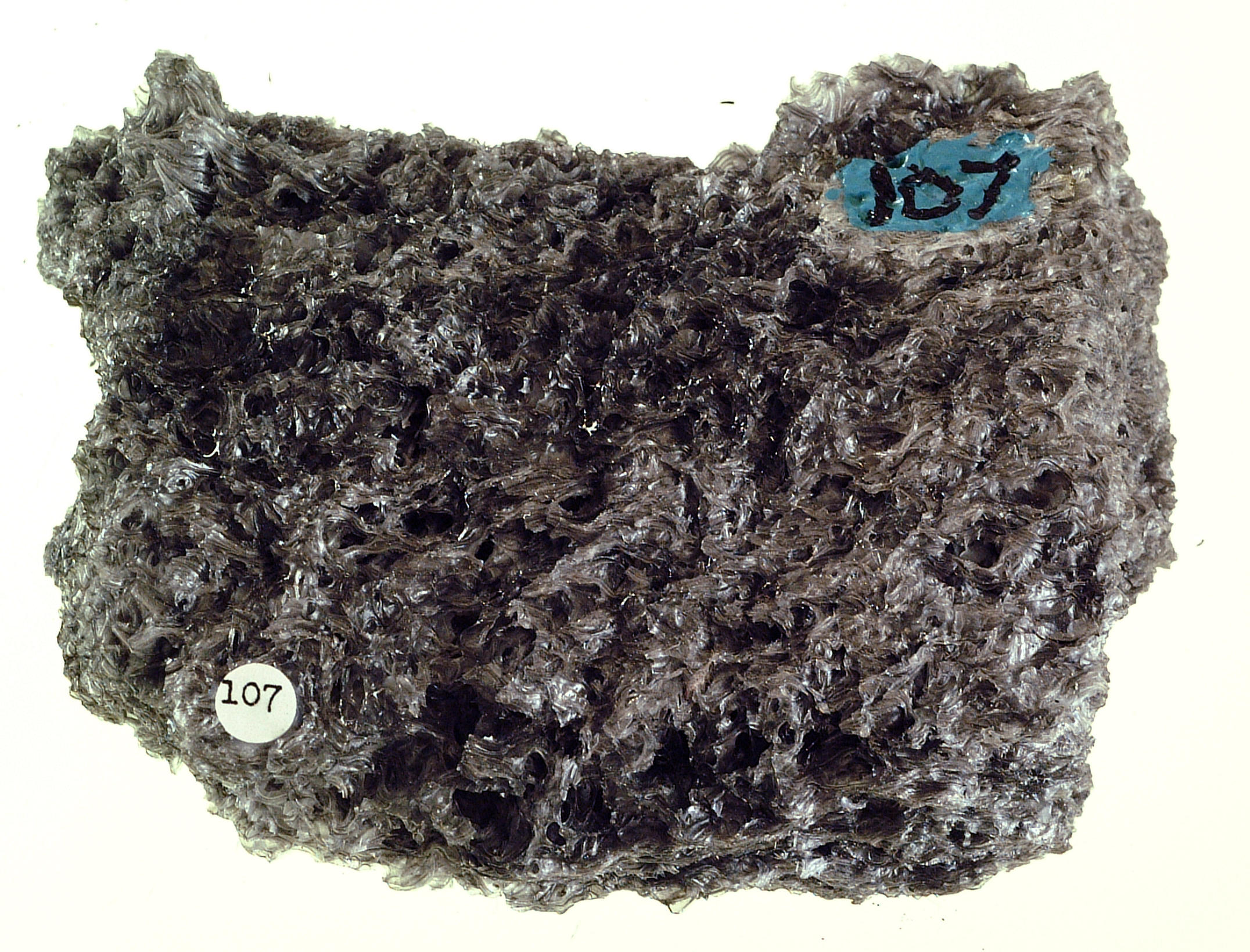
Sample of glassy pumice (9 cm across) from Mono County, California

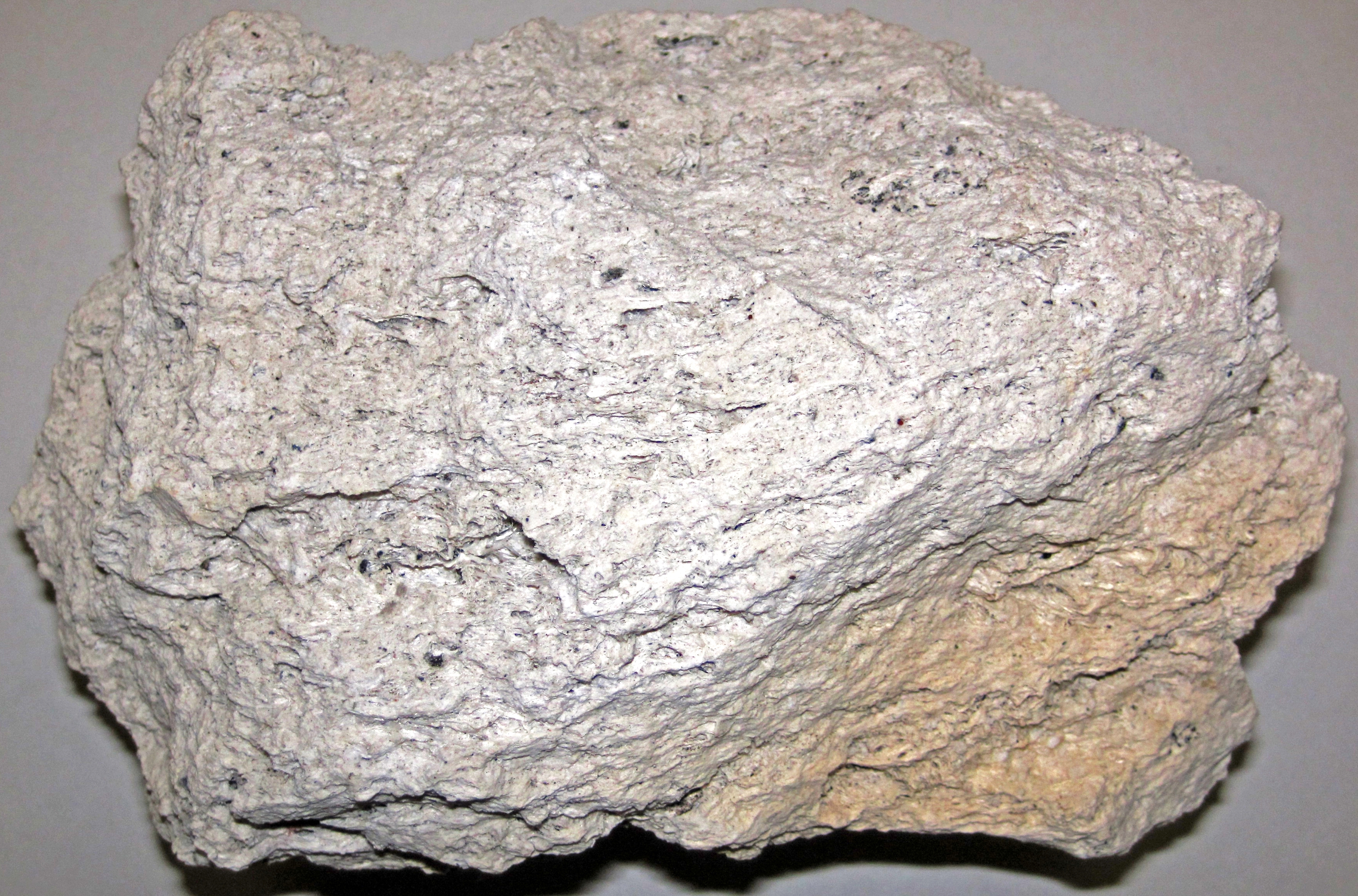
Air fall rhyolitic pumice from the El Cajete deposit of Valles Caldera

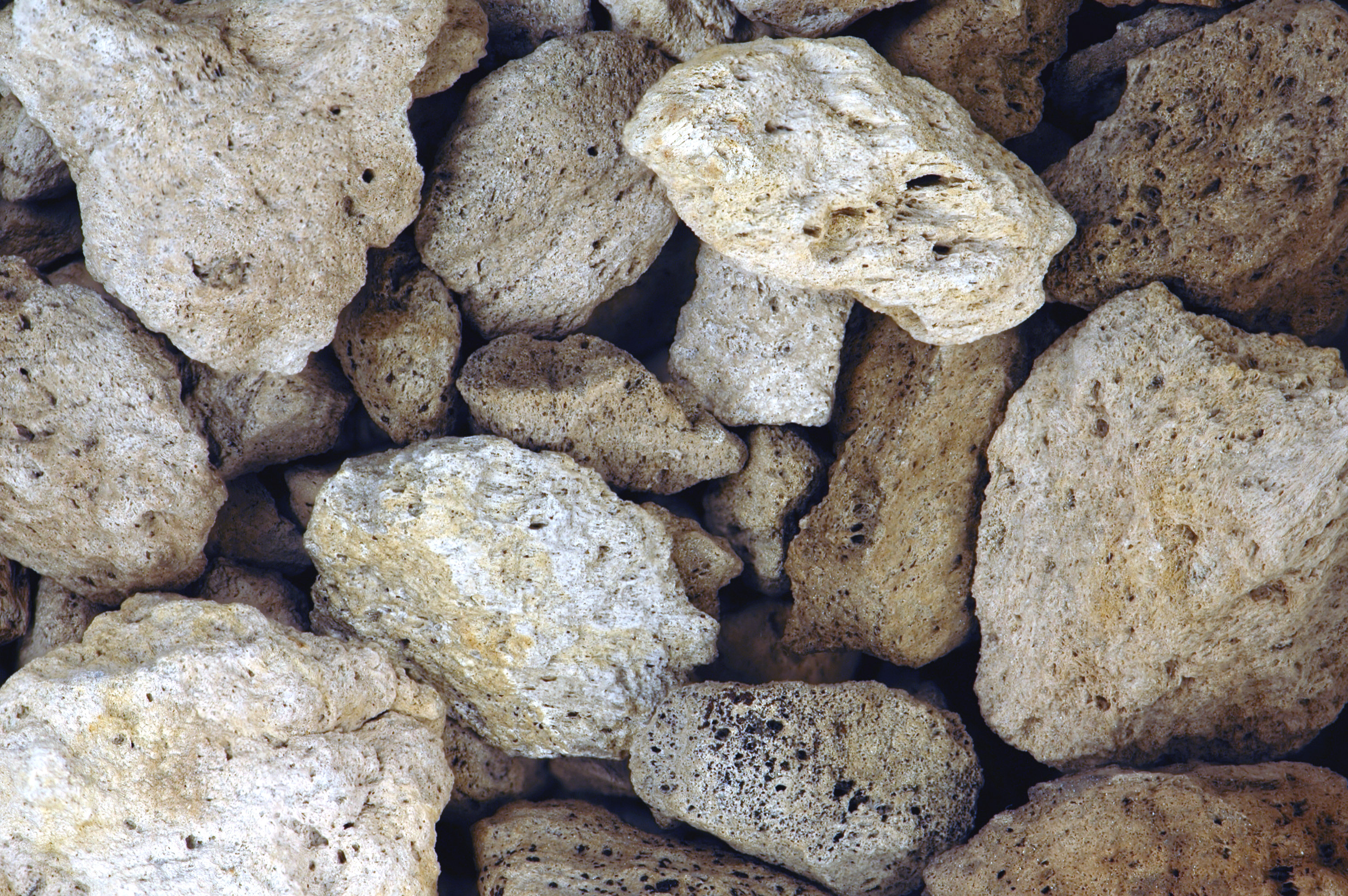
Airfall rhyolitic pumice from the c. 1080 eruption of the Medicine Lake volcano's Glass Mountain vent

== Etymology ==
Pumice is an igneous rock with a foamy appearance. The name is derived from the Latin word pumex (meaning "pumice"), which is related to the Latin word spuma meaning "foam". In former times, pumice was called spuma maris, meaning "froth of the sea" in Latin because the frothy material was thought to be hardened sea foam. Around 80 B.C., it was called lapis spongiae in Latin for its vesicular properties. Many Greek scholars decided there were different sources of pumice, one of which was in the sea coral category.

== Distribution ==
Pumice can be found all around the globe deriving from continental volcanic occurrences and submarine volcanic occurrences. Floating stones can also be distributed by ocean currents. As described earlier, pumice is produced by the eruption of explosive volcanoes under certain conditions; therefore, natural sources occur in volcanically active regions. Pumice is mined and transported from these regions. In 2011, Italy and Turkey led pumice-mining production at 4 and 3 million tons respectively; other large producers at or exceeding a million tonnes were Greece, Iran, Chile, and Syria. Total world pumice production in 2011 was estimated at 17 million tonnes.

=== Asia ===
There are large reserves of pumice in Asian countries, for example Afghanistan, Indonesia, Japan, Syria, Iran, the Philippines and eastern Russia.

Considerable amounts of pumice can be found at the Kamchatka Peninsula on the eastern flank of Russia. This area contains 19 active volcanoes and it lies in close proximity with the Pacific volcanic belt.

Asia is also the site of the second-largest volcanic eruption in the 20th century, the 1991 eruption of Mount Pinatubo, in the Philippines. Ash and pumice lapilli were distributed over a mile around the volcano. The June 15 eruption deposited two main types of anhydrite-bearing pumice: a dominant porphyritic, phenocryst-rich white pumice and a subordinate phenocryst-poor gray/tan pumice. These ejections filled trenches that once reached 200 m (660 ft) deep. So much magma was displaced from the vent that the volcano became a depression on the surface of the Earth.

A basaltic trachyandesitic-to-trachydacitic pumice-and-scoria deposit underlies Manila and is called the Diliman Tuff. It consists of an ignimbrite along with reworked and airfall pumiceous tuff units. It is part of the larger Guadalupe Tuff Formation and is the youngest layer of it. Magma mixing and mingling is shown by banded textures in some of the pumice fragments, considerable range in groundmass composition (54 to 65 wt.% SiO_{2}) in a single pumice fragment. The source volcano of this deposit has not yet been discovered. It is chemically distinct from adjacent Taal Caldera and Laguna Caldera with respect to both major- and trace-element concentrations.

The Taal Volcano south of Manila has also produced several extensive ignimbrite forming eruptions. The earliest of this unit is dated to 670ka and is called the Sampaga Formation.

Another well-known volcano that has produced pumice is Krakatoa. An eruption in 1883 ejected so much pumice that kilometers of sea were covered in floating pumice and in some areas the pumice raft thickness above sea level was 1.5 meters.

=== Europe ===
Europe is the largest producer of pumice with deposits in Italy, Turkey, Greece, Hungary, Iceland, and Germany. Italy is the largest producer of pumice because of its numerous eruptive volcanoes. On the Aeolian Islands of Italy, the island of Lipari is entirely made up of volcanic rock, including pumice. Large amounts of igneous rock on Lipari are due to the numerous extended periods of volcanic activity from the Late Pleistocene (Tyrrhenian) to the Holocene.

=== North America ===
Pumice can be found all across North America, including on the Caribbean Islands. In the United States, pumice is mined in Nevada, Oregon, Idaho, Arizona, California, New Mexico and Kansas. U.S. production of pumice and pumicite in 2011 was estimated at 380,000 tonnes, valued at $7.7 million with approximately 46% coming from Nevada and Oregon. Idaho is also known as a large producer of pumice because of the quality and brightness of the rock found in local reserves.

Mount Mazama in Oregon erupted 7,700 years ago and deposited 91 m (300 ft) of pumice and ash around the vent. The large amount of magma that was erupted caused the structure to collapse, forming a caldera now known as Crater Lake.

Mount St. Helens produced a large amount of dacitic pumice in 1980. Two main types were observed which are the white/tan and gray types. The white type has phenocrysts while being little or absent in microlite content unlike the gray type which has the presence of microlites. Vesicularity for the white pumice is higher with around 85.7% vesicularity and thus is less dense while the gray type is lower with around 72.2% vesicularity and has a higher density. The vesicles of the white pumice are larger and more interconnected while the vesicles of the gray pumice are smaller, with hindered expansion and coalescence.

=== South America ===
Chile is one of the leading producers of pumice in the world. The Puyehue-Cordón Caulle are two coalesced volcanoes in the Andes mountains that ejected ash and pumice across Chile and Argentina. A recent eruption in 2011 wreaked havoc on the region by covering all surfaces and lakes in ash and pumice.

=== Africa ===
Kenya, Ethiopia and Tanzania have some deposits of pumice.

=== New Zealand ===
The Havre Seamount volcano produced the largest-known deep ocean volcanic eruption on Earth. The volcano erupted in July 2012 but remained unnoticed until enormous pieces of pumice were seen to be floating on the Pacific Ocean. Blankets of rock reached a thickness of 5 meters. Most of this floating pumice is deposited on the northwest coast of New Zealand and the Polynesia islands.

== Mining ==
The mining of pumice is an environmentally friendly process compared with other mining methods because the igneous rock is deposited on the surface of the earth in loose aggregate form. The material is mined by open-pit methods. Soils are removed by machinery in order to obtain more pure quality pumice. Scalping screens are used to filter impure surficial pumice of organic soils and unwanted rocks. Blasting is not necessary because the material is unconsolidated, therefore only simple machinery is used such as bulldozers and power shovels. Different sizes of pumice are needed for specific uses therefore crushers are used to achieve desired grades ranging from lump, coarse, intermediate, fine, and extra fine.

== Use in volcanology ==
The detailed study of pumice, both in its areal and stratigraphic distribution, as well as in its internal structure and chemistry, plays an important role in volcanology and the broader Earth sciences. Several different types of internal structures and components in pumice exist at different scales and each allows volcanologists to decode different types of information about the eruption that formed the pumice. Beginning at the largest scale, pumice often contains abundant vesicles—void spaces left behind by bubbles that developed in the material while it was still molten, as a result of its formation by explosive volcanism with abundant gas. The abundance and morphology of vesicles in pumice offer direct evidence of volatile exsolution and degassing dynamics during the eruption that formed the rock. By analyzing vesicle size distributions, connectivity, and spatial arrangements, volcanologists can infer the history, style, and flow dynamics of a particular eruption. For instance, a high density of isolated vesicles may indicate rapid decompression and limited bubble coalescence, characteristic of more explosive eruptions, while interconnected vesicle networks could suggest more efficient gas escape and a more effusive eruptive style.

While vesicles in pumice constitute their own utility to volcano science, the glassy matrix or groundmass that makes up the larger part of the solid component in pumice can also provide a wealth of information for study. This matrix material consists of abundant, microscopic fragments of glass—quenched melt—representing the final bulk composition of the magma at the moment of eruption and fragmentation, and as such can be a kind of geochemical fingerprint, allowing researchers to identify the source of an eruption and reconstruct the evolution of its magma. Additionally, the distribution and composition of crystals and lithic fragments embedded in the pumice matrix provide a window into the history of magmatic processes in the subsurface. Careful analysis of the mineral assemblages in pumice can be used to determine temperature, pressure, and volatile content in the magma chamber and greater transcrustal volcanic plumbing system. Volcanologists can examine the distribution of crystal sizes in pumice and use diffusion chronometry to examine compositional zoning in individual crystals in order to gain an understanding into the timescales involved in a single eruption—the residence time of the crystal in the magma chamber before it was erupted. Lithic fragments, derived from the walls of volcanic conduits or from the country rock, offer additional evidence in the way of eruptive processes and wall-rock assimilation.

Finally, at the smallest scale, melt inclusions trapped within growing crystals in the melt and preserved in the erupted pumice product serve as time capsules of magmatic conditions prior to and during eruption. These inclusions may contain a variety of materials ranging from silicate melt, volatiles such as H_{2}O and CO_{2}, and less frequently, sulfides and/or halogens, preserving information about the pre-eruptive volatile budget and redox state of the magma chamber. Analysis of the shapes of melt inclusions—namely, the degree to which originally bubble-shaped melt inclusions have become faceted over time—can be used as an additional chronometer and indication of magma residence time and repose of the volcanic system. Through detailed analysis of melt inclusion chemistry and volatile contents, volcanologists can reconstruct the conditions of a volcanic system in the subsurface prior to eruption, providing information about the eruptive process that not only increases understanding of volcanic eruptions as a subject of scientific study, but also helps scientists and policymakers in the area of planning for volcanic hazards. As such, pumice is not merely a product of explosive volcanism, but a vital archive of eruptive processes and magmatic evolution.

== Other uses ==
Pumice is a very lightweight, porous and abrasive material and it has been used for centuries in the construction and beauty industries as well as in early medicine. It is also used as an abrasive, especially in polishes, pencil erasers, and the production of stone-washed jeans. Pumice was also used in the early book-making industry to prepare parchment paper and leather bindings. There is high demand for pumice, particularly for water filtration, chemical spill containment, cement manufacturing, horticulture and increasingly for the pet industry. The mining of pumice in environmentally sensitive areas has been under more scrutiny after such an operation was stopped in the U.S. state of Oregon, at Rock Mesa in the southern part of the Three Sisters Wilderness.

=== Early medicine ===
Pumice has been used in the medicinal industry for more than 2000 years. Ancient Chinese medicine used ground pumice along with ground mica and fossilized bones added to teas to calm the spirit. This tea was used to treat dizziness, nausea, insomnia, and anxiety disorders. Ingestion of these pulverized rocks was believed to be able to soften nodules and was later used with other herbal ingredients to treat gallbladder cancer and urinary difficulties. In Western medicine, beginning in the early 18th century, pumice ground into a sugar consistency mixed with other ingredients was used to attempt to treat ulcers mostly on the skin and cornea. Concoctions such as these were also used to help wounds scar in a supposedly healthier manner. In approximately 1680 it was noted by an English naturalist that pumice powder was used to promote sneezing.

=== Personal care ===
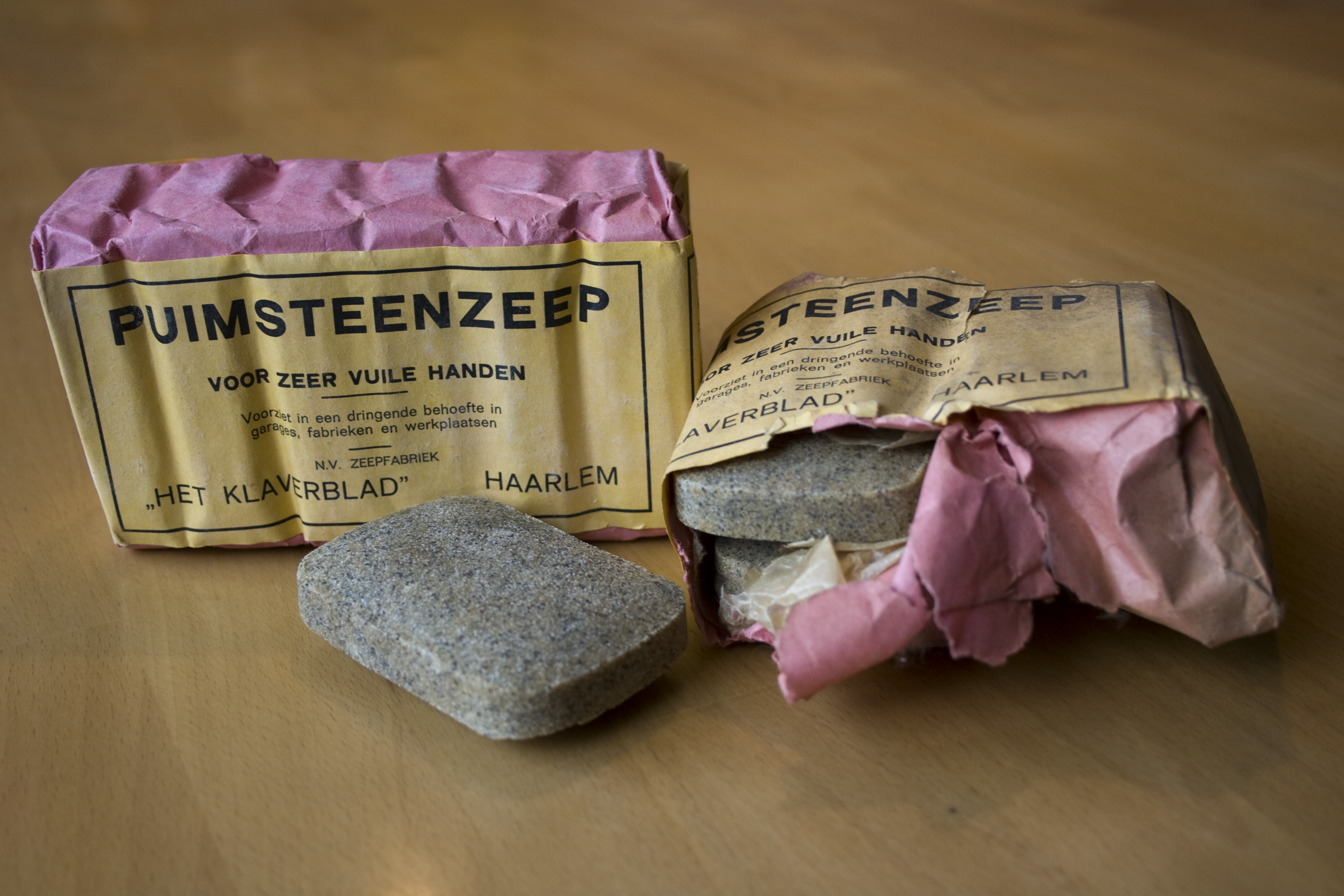
Pumice soap bars

Pumice has been used as a material in personal care for thousands of years. It is an abrasive material that can be used in powdered form or as a stone to remove unwanted hair or skin. In ancient Egypt, it was common to remove all hair on the body to control lice and as a form of ritual purification, using creams, razors, and pumice stones. Pumice in powdered form was an ingredient in toothpastes in ancient Rome. Nail care was very important in ancient China; nails were kept groomed with pumice stones, and pumice stones were also used to remove calluses.

It was discovered in a Roman poem that pumice was used to remove dead skin as far back as 100 BC, and likely before then. It has been used throughout many eras since then, including the Victorian era. Today, many of these techniques are still used; pumice is widely used as a skin exfoliant. Even though hair removal techniques have evolved over the centuries, abrasive material like pumice stones is also still used. "Pumice stones" are often used in beauty salons during the pedicure process to remove dry and excess skin from the bottom of the foot as well as calluses.

Finely ground pumice has been added to some toothpastes as a polish, similar to Roman use, and easily removes dental plaque build-up. Such toothpaste is too abrasive for daily use. Pumice is also added to heavy-duty hand cleaners (such as lava soap) as a mild abrasive. Some brands of chinchilla dust bath are formulated with powdered pumice. Old beauty techniques using pumice are still employed today but newer substitutes are easier to obtain.

=== Cleaning ===
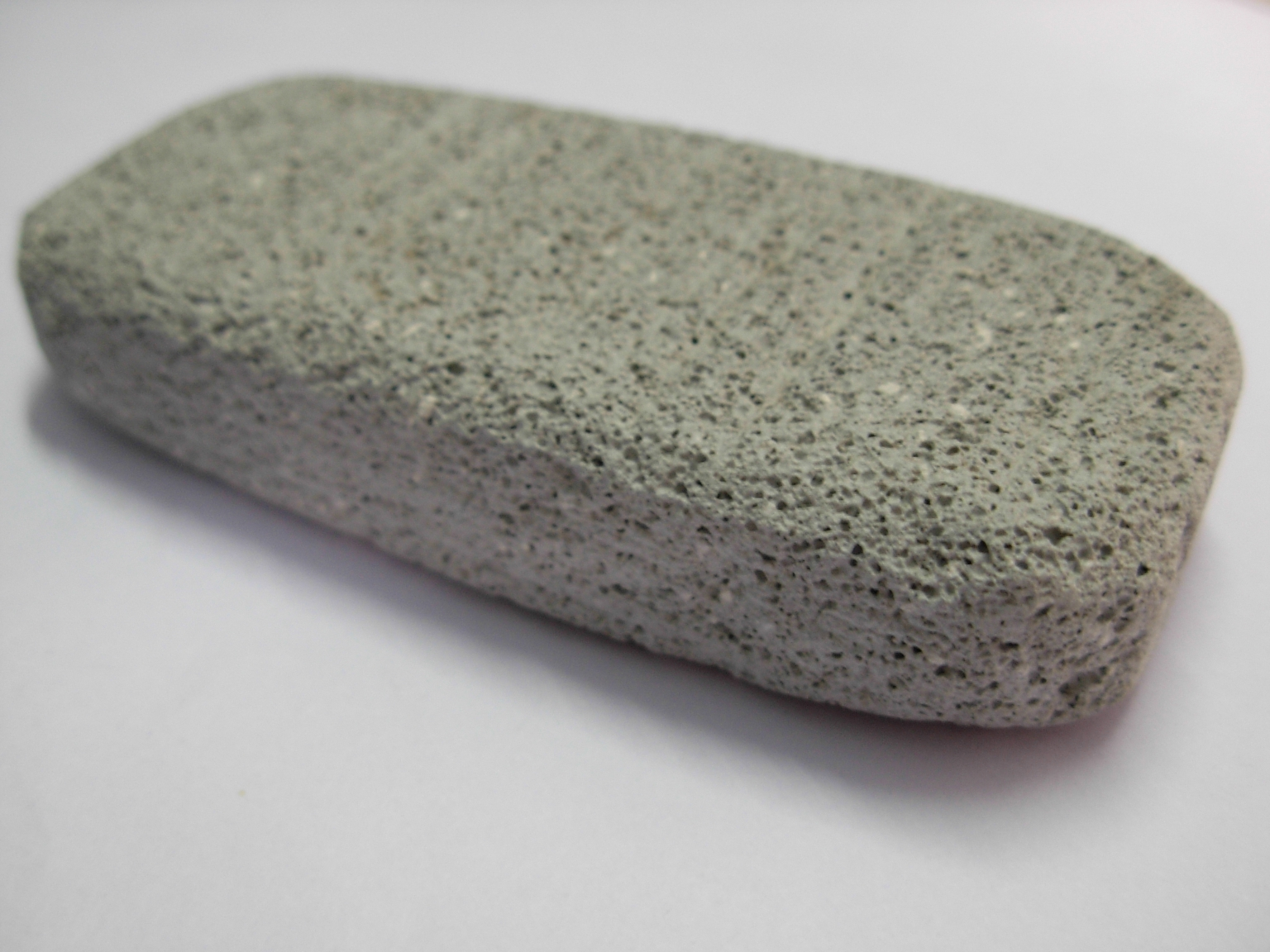
Bar of artificially produced pumice

Artificially shaped pumice, sometimes attached to a handle, is an effective scrubbing tool for removal of limescale, rust, hard water rings, and other stains on porcelain fixtures in households (e.g., bathrooms). It is a quick method compared to alternatives like chemicals or vinegar and baking soda or borax.

=== Horticulture ===
Good soil requires sufficient water and nutrient loading as well as little compaction to allow easy exchange of gases. The roots of plants require continuous transportation of carbon dioxide and oxygen to and from the surface. Pumice improves the quality of soil because of its porous properties; water and gases can be transported easily through the pores and nutrients can be stored in the microscopic holes. Pumice rock fragments are inorganic therefore no decomposition and little compaction occur.

Another benefit of this inorganic rock is that it does not attract or host fungi or insects. As drainage is very important in horticulture, with the presence of pumice tillage is much easier. Pumice usage also creates ideal conditions for growing plants like cacti and succulents as it increases the water retention in sandy soils and reduces the density of clayey soils to allow more transportation of gases and water. The addition of pumice to soil improves and increases vegetative cover as the roots of plants make slopes more stable therefore it helps reduce erosion. It is often used on roadsides and ditches and commonly used in turf and golf courses to maintain grass cover and flatness that can degrade due to large amounts of traffic and compaction. Chemically pumice is pH neutral, neither acidic nor alkaline. In 2011, 16% of pumice mined in the United States was used for horticultural purposes.

Pumice contributes to soil fertility in areas where it is naturally present in the soil due to volcanic activity. For example, in the Jemez Mountains of New Mexico, the Ancestral Puebloans settled on "pumice patches" of the El Cajete Pumice which likely retained a greater amount of moisture and was ideal for farming.

=== Construction ===
Pumice is widely used to make lightweight concrete and insulative low-density cinder blocks. The air-filled vesicles in this porous rock serve as a good insulator. A fine-grained version of pumice called pozzolan is used as an additive in cement and is mixed with lime to form a light-weight, smooth, plaster-like concrete. This form of concrete was used as far back as Roman times. Roman engineers utilized it to build the huge dome of the Pantheon with increasing amounts of pumice added to concrete for higher elevations of the structure. It was also commonly used as a construction material for many aqueducts.

One of the main uses of pumice currently in the United States is manufacturing concrete. This rock has been used in concrete mixtures for thousands of years and continues to be used in producing concrete, especially in regions close to where this volcanic material is deposited.

New studies prove a broader application of pumice powder in the concrete industry. Pumice can act as a cementitious material in concrete and researchers have shown that concrete made with up to 50% pumice powder can significantly improve durability yet reduce greenhouse gas emissions and fossil fuel consumption.
