= Meibom =

Meibom may refer to:

- 7049 Meibom, a minor planet
- Anders Meibom (born 1969), Danish interdisciplinary scientist
- Heinrich Meibom (poet) (1555–1625), German historian and poet
- Heinrich Meibom (doctor) (1638–1700), his grandson, German physician and scholar
  - Meibomian gland
