= Helle Ploug =

Marine scientist

- Education: Aarhus University
- Scientific career
- Thesis: Light and photosynthesis in dense populations of microalgae (1996)

Helle Ploug is marine scientist known for her work on particles in seawater. She is a professor at the University of Gothenburg, and was named a fellow of the Association for the Sciences of Limnology and Oceanography in 2017.

== Education and career ==
Ploug grew up in Denmark. She has an M.Sc. (1992) and a Ph.D. (1996) from Aarhus University. Following her Ph.D. she did postdoctoral work at the Max Planck Institute for Marine Microbiology and the University of Copenhagen. Starting in 2006 she was a scientist at the Alfred Wegener Institute for Polar and Marine Research, and in 2008 she moved to Stockholm University where she had a Marie Curie fellowship. In 2006 she became an associate professor at the University of Gothenburg where she was promoted to professor in 2013.

== Research ==
Ploug's early research used fiber optic sensors to measure light in marine sediments. She went on to examine how particles assemble in marine systems. Her work on particles includes developing methods to quantify bacterial use of particles, and the implications for consumption of particles produced by copepods. Ploug has developed methods to measure how fast particles sink through the ocean and the rate sinking particles are converted into carbon dioxide. Her recent research has focused on measurements of biogeochemical cycling at the single cell level using Nanoscale secondary ion mass spectrometry.

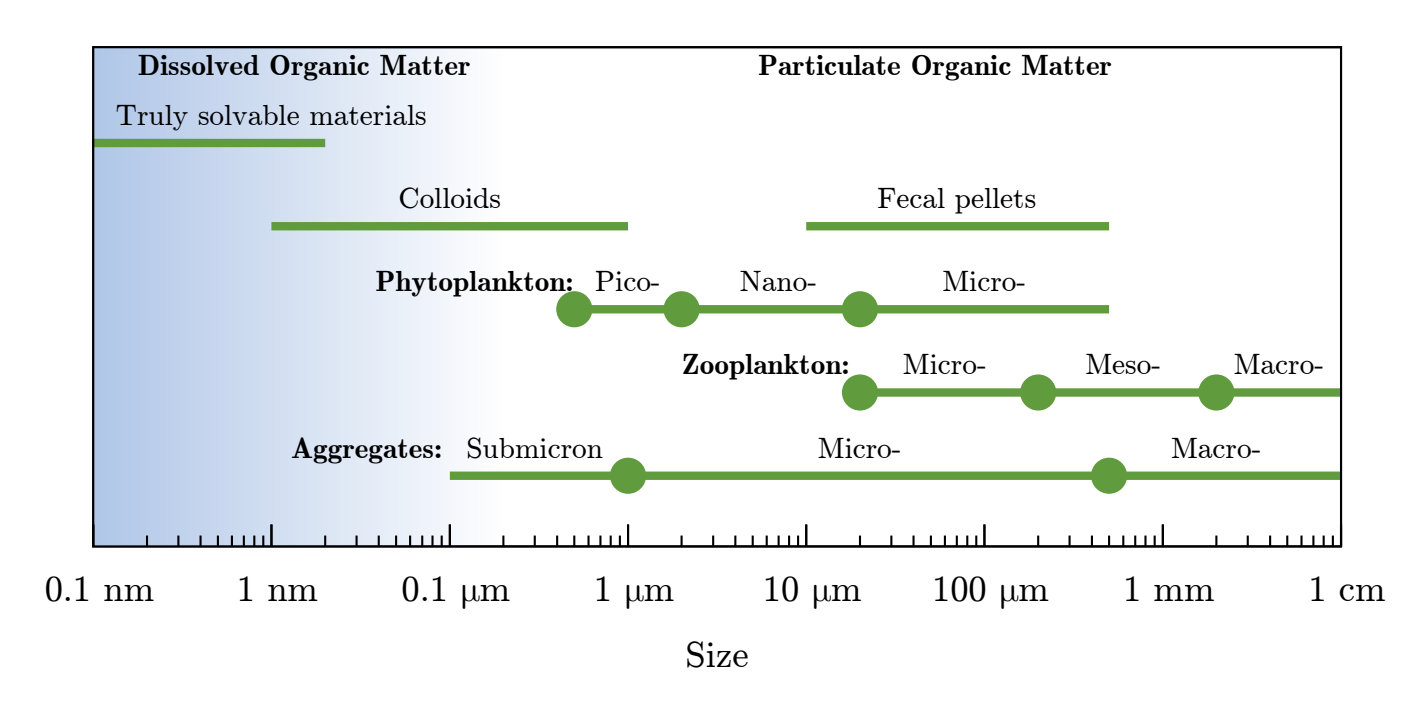
Size and classification of marine particles from Simon, Grossart, Schweitzer, and Ploug (2002) Aquatic Microbial Ecology.

== Selected publications ==
- Simon, M; Grossart, Hp; Schweitzer, B; Ploug, H (2002). "Microbial ecology of organic aggregates in aquatic ecosystems". Aquatic Microbial Ecology. 28: 175–211. doi:10.3354/ame028175. ISSN 0948-3055.
- Ploug, H; Kühl, M; Buchholz-Cleven, B; Jørgensen, Bb (1997). "Anoxic aggregates - an ephemeral phenomenon in the pelagic environment?". Aquatic Microbial Ecology. 13: 285–294. doi:10.3354/ame013285. ISSN 0948-3055.
- Ploug, Helle; Iversen, Morten Hvitfeldt; Fischer, Gerhard (2008). "Ballast, sinking velocity, and apparent diffusivity within marine snow and zooplankton fecal pellets: Implications for substrate turnover by attached bacteria". Limnology and Oceanography. 53 (5): 1878–1886. Bibcode:2008LimOc..53.1878P. doi:10.4319/lo.2008.53.5.1878. S2CID 11961354.
- Ploug, H; Grossart, Hp; Azam, F; Jørgensen, Bb (1999). "Photosynthesis, respiration, and carbon turnover in sinking marine snow from surface waters of Southern California Bight:implications for the carbon cycle in the ocean". Marine Ecology Progress Series. 179: 1–11. Bibcode:1999MEPS..179....1P. doi:10.3354/meps179001. ISSN 0171-8630.
- Iversen, M. H.; Ploug, H. (2010-09-07). "Ballast minerals and the sinking carbon flux in the ocean: carbon-specific respiration rates and sinking velocity of marine snow aggregates". Biogeosciences. 7 (9): 2613–2624. Bibcode:2010BGeo....7.2613I. doi:10.5194/bg-7-2613-2010. ISSN 1726-4189.

== Awards and honors ==
In 2017 Ploug was named a fellow of the Association for the Sciences of Limnology and Oceanography.
