= Anders Meibom =

Danish scientist

Professor Anders Meibom
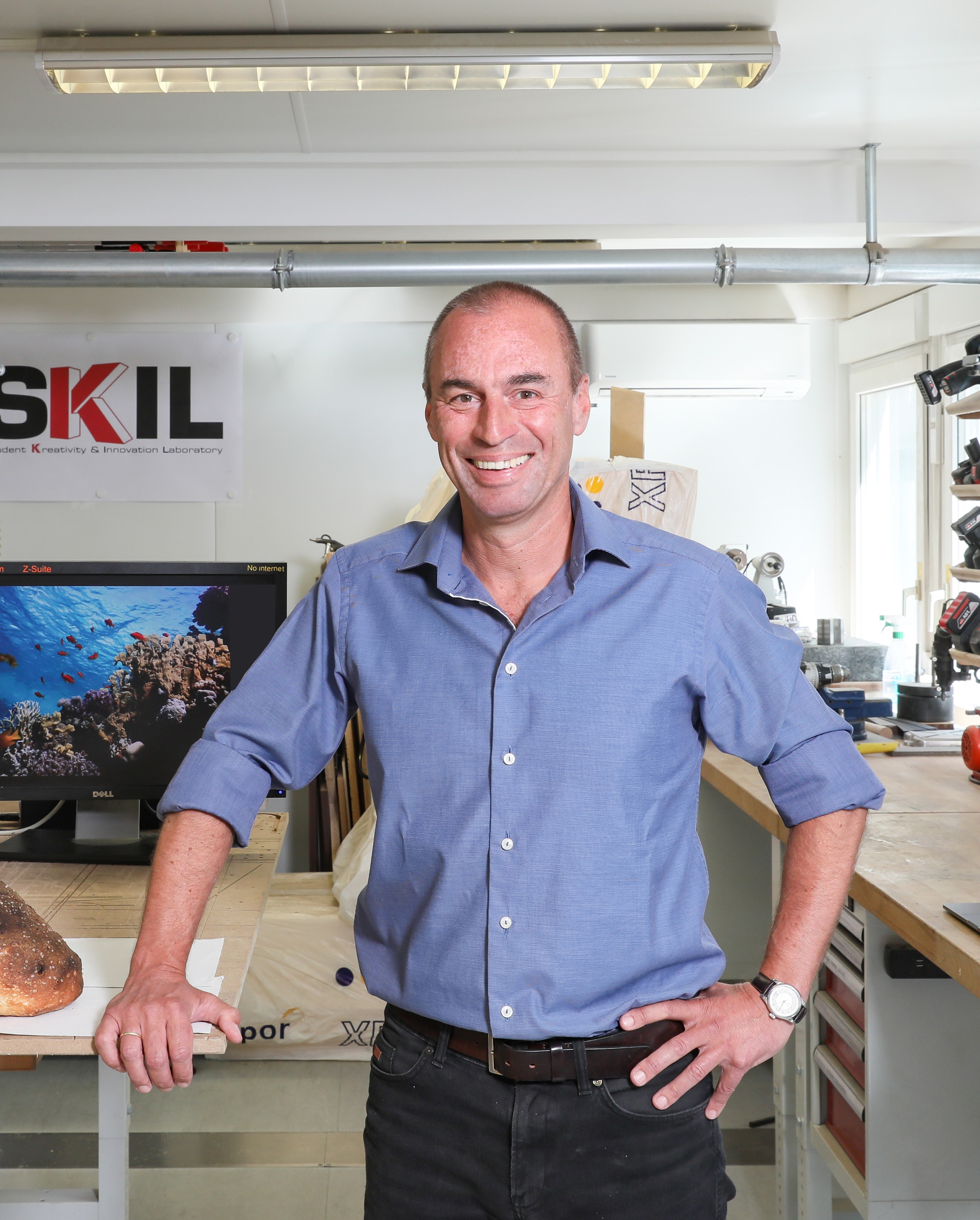
- Anders Meibom in 2020
- Citizenship: DenmarkSwitzerland

Academic background
- Education: University of Southern Denmark

Academic work
- Discipline: Environmental bio-geochemistry
- Institutions: École Polytechnique Fédérale de Lausanne (EPFL)
- Main interests: Isotope geochemistry, cell metabolism
- Website: https://www.epfl.ch/labs/lgb/

Anders Meibom (born 9 September 1969) is a Danish and Swiss interdisciplinary scientist and former football player active in the field of bio-geochemistry. He is a professor at the École Polytechnique Fédérale de Lausanne (EPFL), where he heads the laboratory for biological geochemistry.

== Career ==
Meibom obtained a PhD in physics at the University of Southern Denmark in 1997 followed by a two-and-a-half-year postdoc at the Hawaii Institute for Geophysics and Planetology where he studied the mineralogy of primitive chondrotic meteorites. In 2000, he moved to Stanford University as a research associate in the Stanford-USGS ion microprobe laboratory, department of geological and environmental sciences. In 2005, he was appointed as an associate professor at the Museum National d’Histoire Naturelle in Paris, where he was promoted to full professor in 2007. From 2006 to 2011, he served as the director of the French National NanoSIMS analytical facility. In 2012, he was named full professor at the EPFL (École Polytechnique Fédérale de Lausanne) in the School of Architecture, Civil and Environmental Engineering (ENAC). He is full professor ad personam at the University of Lausanne since 2014. From 2015 to 2017, he was the director of the Institute of Environmental Engineering at EPFL.

In 2019, Meibom founded the Transnational Red Sea Center (TRSC), an initiative for scientific diplomacy supported by the Swiss Federal Department of Foreign Affairs. This initiative sprang from a series of scientific studies carried out in the years before, to which his laboratory ontributed strongly, demonstrating that Red Sea corals have exceptional resistance to the stress imposed by global warming and therefore de facto represents humanity’s best hope to preserve a major coral reef ecosystem alive and functioning past the end of this century – hence their designation as the “reefs of hope”.

== Research ==
Meibom currently leads the laboratory for biological geochemistry at EPFL. Research performed in his laboratory is interdisciplinary in nature, at the interface between isotope geochemistry and biology. Active themes in the laboratory include the use of NanoSIMS to visualize and characterize the diagenesis of biogenic substrates, as well as the study of metabolic processes in symbiotic organisms (notably corals) and how these processes may be influenced by environmental stress, in particular climate change.

== Distinctions ==
In 2008, Meibom was awarded with the Medal for Research Excellence by the European Mineralogical Union for his contributions in the field of cosmochemistry. From 2009 to 2012, he was appointed member of the Comité National Section 18 at the French National Centre for Scientific Research (CNRS), France. In 2009 and 2017, Meibom was awarded advanced grants by the European Research Council for projects aiming to better understand biomineralization processes by marine organisms (Project BioCarb, 2009), as well as to better understand biocarbonate-based paleo-environmental records for the oceans (Project UltraPal, 2017). In 2014 and 2025 he was named Teacher of the Year by the students within the School of Architecture, Civil- and Environmental Engineering at EPFL.
