= Geospeedometry =

Measuring timescales and/or temperatures of thermal events in the history of rock

Geospeedometry is the science of measuring the timescales and/or temperatures of thermal events in the history of a metamorphic or igneous rock using diffusion profiles of elements within individual minerals. "Geospeedometry" refers to the speed, or timescale, of thermal events in geologic materials. The term first appeared in the literature in 1983; prior thermochronometric studies focused on diffusion of iron and magnesium in olivine provided the foundation for the field. Geospeedometry has since developed rapidly as further studies have experimentally calibrated the diffusivity of elements in various minerals.

== Diffusion Theory ==
Geospeedometry makes use of the temperature dependence of the chemical diffusion of elements between zones of a mineral grain. According to Fick's second law, the concentration of an element in one dimension across a diffusive interface is given by the partial differential equation

${\operatorname{\partial}\!C\over\operatorname{\partial}\!t} = {{\operatorname{\partial}}\over{\operatorname{\partial}\!x}}\left(D {\operatorname{\partial}\!C\over\operatorname{\partial}\!x} \right)$

where

- D is the diffusion coefficient, or diffusivity (m^{2} s^{−1}) of the element in the medium
- x is the position (length)
- t is time
- C is the concentration of the element; C(x,t) is a function dependent on both length and time.

For a one-dimensional interface at x = 0 with a fixed concentration C_{0},

$C \left(x,t \right)=C_0 \mathrm{erfc} \left( \frac{x}{2\sqrt{Dt}}\right)$

where erfc is the complementary error function.

The diffusivity of an element in a medium is given by the temperature-dependent Arrhenius equation

$D = D_0 e^{-E_A/RT}$

where

- D_{0} is the maximum diffusivity at infinite temperature; also known as the pre-exponential factor (m^{2} s^{−1})
- E_{A} is the activation energy for diffusivity (J mol^{−1})
- R is the gas constant (J mol^{−1} K^{−1})
- T is absolute temperature (K)

Given an experimentally determined D_{0} for a given element in a given substance, an empirical diffusion profile can be used to calculate the peak temperature or duration of a thermal pulse experienced by the substance. In cases of varying temperature (e.g. during cooling) D becomes a function of time and the simple analytical solution may no longer be applicable.

== Methodology ==
Schematic illustration of an initially sharp concentration gradient between mineral growth zones (blue dashed line) and subsequent measured diffusive gradient (red lines).

Geologists apply diffusion theory to natural minerals in order to understand the thermal histories of igneous and metamorphic systems. Diffusion profiles of a given element are measured between growth zones of a single mineral, or at the interface between two different minerals. In order to measure a diffusion profile in a single crystal, geologists measure one-dimensional transects using high spatial resolution instruments such as the scanning electron microscope, electron microprobe, secondary ion mass spectrometry or nanoscale secondary ion mass spectrometry. By performing inverse modelling of the diffusion profiles, the timescale of diffusion can be estimated.

== Limitations ==
Because the solution to the diffusion equation requires a knowledge of both temperature and time duration of a thermal event, one must be independently constrained in order to measure the other. In geologic systems, neither the temperature nor time duration of thermal events is known a priori. An independent geothermometer must be used to constrain peak temperature in order to use geospeedometry to calculate the duration of a thermal pulse. Conversely, the duration of heating must be constrained independently using geochronology to estimate maximum temperatures. There is ongoing debate in the literature as to geospeedometry's utility to understand large scale magma storage and remobilization.
