= Diffusivity =

Diffusivity is a rate of diffusion, a measure of the rate at which particles or heat or fluids can spread.

It is measured differently for different mediums.

Diffusivity may refer to:

- Thermal diffusivity, diffusivity of heat
- Diffusivity of mass:
  - Mass diffusivity, molecular diffusivity (often called "diffusion coefficient")
  - Eddy diffusion, eddy diffusivity
- Kinematic viscosity, characterising momentum diffusivity
- Magnetic diffusivity

== Dimensions and units ==
Diffusivity has dimensions of length^{2} / time, or m^{2}/s in SI units and cm^{2}/s in CGS units.

== See also ==
- Diffusibility
