= Nanoscale secondary ion mass spectrometry =

Nanoscale secondary ion mass spectrometry (NanoSIMS) is an analytical instrument manufactured by CAMECA which operates on the principle of secondary ion mass spectrometry. The NanoSIMS is used to acquire nanoscale resolution measurements of the elemental and isotopic composition of a sample. The NanoSIMS is able to create nanoscale maps of elemental or isotopic distribution, parallel acquisition of up to seven masses, isotopic identification, high mass resolution, subparts-per-million sensitivity with lateral resolution down to 30 nm.

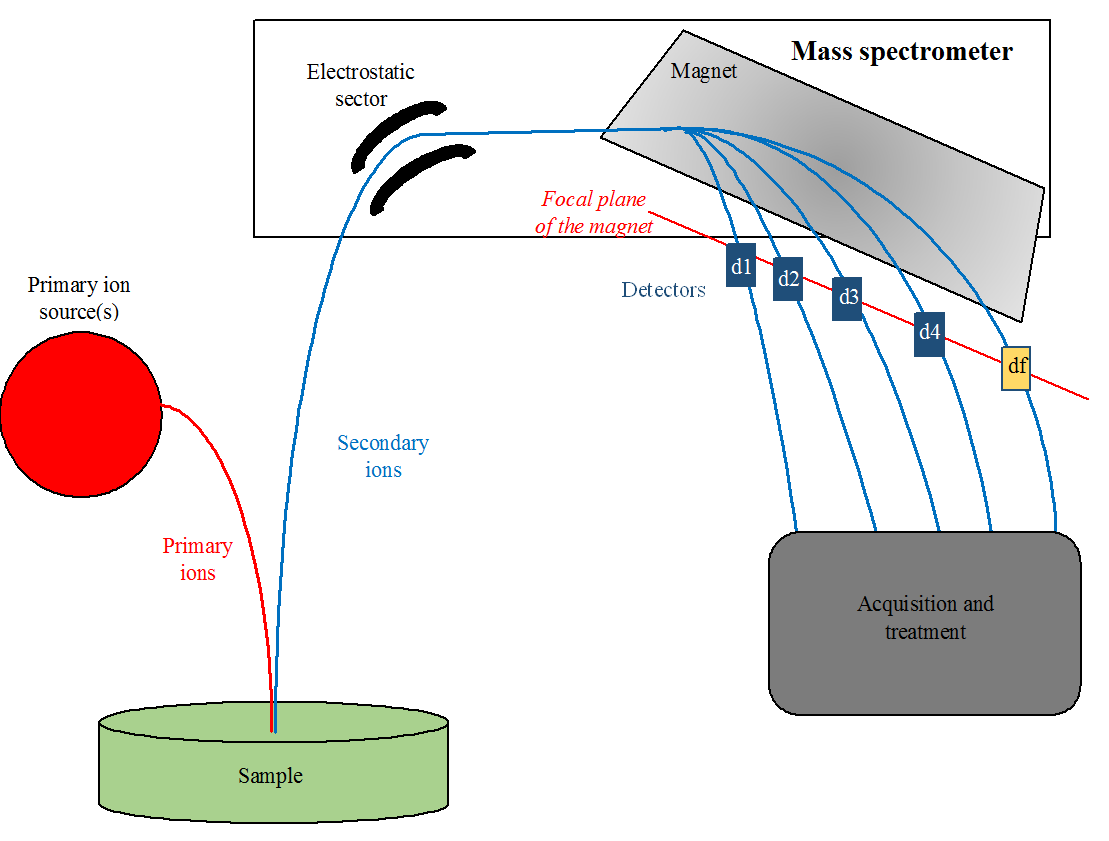
Simplified diagram of a NanoSims50 instrument.

The original design of the NanoSIMS instrument was conceived by Georges Slodzian at the University of Paris Sud in France and at the Office National d'Etudes et de Recherches Aérospatiales. There are currently around 60 NanoSIMS instruments worldwide.

== How it works ==
The NanoSIMS uses an ion source to produce a primary beam of ions. These primary ions erode the sample surface and produce atomic collisions, some of these collisions result in the release of secondary ion particles. These ions are transmitted through a mass spectrometer, where the masses are measured and identified. The primary ion beam is rastered across the sample surface and a ‘map’ of the element and isotope distribution is created by counting the number of ions that originated from each pixel with at best a 30 nanometer lateral resolution, 10-50 times greater than conventional SIMS. This is achieved by positioning the primary probe in close proximity to the sample using a coaxial lens assembly. The primary ion beam impacts the sample surface at 90°, with the secondary ions extracted back through the same lens assembly. This allows for the isotopic composition of individual cells to be distinguished at parts per million (ppm) or parts per billion (ppb) range. The main drawback of this set up is that the primary and secondary ion beams must be of opposite polarity which can limit which elements can be detected simultaneously.

NanoSIMS can detect minute mass differences between ions at the resolution of M/dM > 5000, where M is the nominal mass of the isotope and dM is the mass difference between the isotopes of interest. The high mass resolution capabilities of NanoSIMS allows for different elements and their isotopes to be identified and spatially mapped in the sample, even if very close in mass. The mass spectrometer is capable of multicollection, meaning up to 5 (NanoSIMS 50) or 7 (NanoSIMS 50 L) masses can be simultaneously detected, from hydrogen to uranium, though with limitations. The relatively large number of masses helps eliminate measurement errors as possible changes in instrumental or sample conditions that may occur in between runs are avoided.

The ion beam must either be set to detect negative or positive ions, commonly completed by using a cesium+ or oxygen- beam, respectively. The high mass resolution achievable is particularly relevant to biological applications. For example, nitrogen is one of the most common elements in organisms. However, due to the low electron affinity of the nitrogen atom, the production of secondary ions is rare. Instead, molecules such as CN can be generated and measured. However, due to isotope combinations, such as the isobars ^{13}C^{14}N-, and ^{12}C^{15}N-, nearly identical molecular weights of 27.000 and 27.006 daltons, respectively, will be generated. Unlike other imaging techniques, where ^{13}C^{14}N and ^{12}C^{15}N cannot be independently measured due to nearly identical masses, NanoSIMS can safely distinguish the differences between these molecules allowing isotopic spiking experiments to be conducted.

== The physics of NanoSIMS ==
The magnetic sector mass spectrometer causes a physical separation of ions of a different mass-to-charge ratio. The physical separation of the secondary ions is caused by the Lorentz force when the ions pass through a magnetic field that is perpendicular to the velocity vector of the secondary ions. The Lorentz force states that a particle will experience a force

$$\mathbf{F} = q\left[\mathbf{E} + (\mathbf{v} \times \mathbf{B})\right]$$

when it maintains a charge q and travels through an electric field E and magnetic field B with a velocity v. The secondary ions that leave the surface of the sample typically have a kinetic energy of a few electron volts (eV), although a rather small portion have been found to have energy of a few keV. An electrostatic field captures the secondary ions that leave the sample surface; these extracted ions are then transferred to a mass spectrometer. In order to achieve precise isotope measurements, there is a need for high transmission and high mass resolution. High transmission refers to the low loss of secondary ions between the sample surface and the detector, and high mass resolution refers to the ability to efficiently separate the secondary ions (or molecules of interest) from other ions and/or ions of similar mass. Primary ions will collide with the surface at a specific frequency per unit of surface area. The collision that occurs causes atoms to sputter from the sample surface, and of these atoms only a small amount will undergo ionization. These become secondary ions, which are then detected after transfer through the mass spectrometer. Each primary ion generates a number of secondary ions of an isotope that will reach the detector to be counted. The count rate is determined by

$$I(^{i}M) = d_\mathrm{b} \times S \times Y \times X_\mathrm{M} \times A_\mathrm{i} \times Y_\mathrm{i} \times T$$

where I(^{i}M)is the count rate of the isotope ^{i}M of element M. The counting rate of the isotope is dependent on the concentration, X_{M} and the element's isotopic abundance, denoted A_{i}. Because the primary ion beam determines the secondary ions, Y, that are sputtered, the density of the primary ion beam, d_{b}, which is defined as the amount of ions per second per unit of surface area, will affect a portion of the surface area of the sample, S, with an even distribution of the primary ions. Of the sputtered secondary ions, there is only a fraction that will be ionized, Y_{i}. The probability that any ion will be successfully transferred from mass spectrometer to detector is T. The product of Y_{i} and T determines the amount of isotopes that will be ionized, as well as detected, so it is considered the useful yield.

== Sample preparation ==
Sample preparation is one of the most critical steps in NanoSIMS analysis, particularly when analysing biological samples. Specific protocols should be developed for individual experiments in order to best preserve not only the structure of the sample but also the true spatial distribution and abundance of molecules within the sample. As the NanoSIMS operates under ultra high vacuum, the sample must be vacuum compatible (i.e., volatile free), flat, which reduces varying ionization trajectories, and conductive, which can be accomplished by sputter coating with Au, Pt, or C. Biological samples, such as cells or tissue, can be prepared with chemical fixation or cryo-fixation and embedded in a resin before sectioning into thin slices (100 nm - 1μm), and placed on silicon wafers or slides for analysis. Sample preparation for metallographic samples is generally much simpler but a very good metallographic polish is required to achieve a flat, scratch free surface.

== Applications ==
NanoSIMS can capture the spatial variability of isotopic and elemental measurements of sub-micron areas, grains or inclusions from geological, materials science and biological samples. This instrument can characterise nanostructured materials with complex composition that are increasingly important candidates for energy generation and storage.

=== Geological applications ===
NanoSIMS has also proved useful in studying cosmochemical issues, where samples of single, micro- or sub-micrometer-sized grains from meteorites as well as microtome sections prepared by the focused ion beam (FIB) technique can be analyzed. NanoSIMS can be combined with transmission electron microscopy (TEM) when using microtome or FIB sections. This combination allows for correlated mineralogical and isotopic studies in situ at a sub-micrometer scale.

It is particularly useful in materials research because of its high sensitivity at high mass resolution, which allow for trace element imaging and quantification.

=== Biological applications ===
Initially developed for geochemical and related research, NanoSIMS is now utilized by a wide variety of fields, including biology and microbiology. In biomedical research, NanoSIMS is also referred to as multi-isotope imaging mass spectrometry (MIMS). The 50 nm resolution allows unprecedented resolution of cellular and sub-cellular features (as reference, the model organism E. coli is typically 1,000 to 2,000 nm in diameter). The high resolution that it offers allows intracellular measurement of accumulations and fluxes of molecules containing various stable isotopes. NanoSIMS can be used for pure cultures, co-cultures, and mixed community samples.

The first use of NanoSIMS in biology was by Peteranderl and Lechene in 2004, who used a prototype of NanoSIMS to examine and measure carbon and nitrogen isotopes of eukaryotic cells. This study was the first time that carbon and nitrogen isotope ratios were directly measured at a sub-cellular scale in a biological sample.

=== Pharmacology applications ===
The development of NanoSIMS for organo-metallic drugs paved the way for exploring the distribution of biologically active molecules at the subcellular level. Legin et al. combined NanoSIMS with fluorescence confocal laser scanning microscopy to characterize the subcellular distribution of ^{15}N isotopically labeled Pt-bearing cisplatin in human colon cancer cells. Cisplatin appears in the targeted nucleus of the colon cancer cells. ^{15}N and Pt are separated showing subcellular metabolism is in the path of action. The internalization of amiodarone into the lysosomes of macrophages is illustrated in Jiang et al. Thanks to low detection limit, two iodine atoms of ^{127}I in amiodarone molecule enables a label-free imaging by NanoSIMS. Iodine and phosphorus imaging along with plotting the intensity of ^{127}I^{−} vs ^{31}P^{−} indicated a linear relationship between the amount of iodine and phospholipids. These results disclose evidence of amiodarone-induced phospholipidosis.

He et al. visualized the distribution of therapeutic antisense oligonucleotides labelled with bromine (Br-ASO) in some varieties of cultured cells and importantly mouse tissues (heart, kidney, and Liver) using NanoSIMS data combined with back scattered electron microscopy. They demonstrated that phosphorothioate ASOs associate with filopodia and the inner nuclear membrane of cells. They also documented essential cellular and subcellular heterogeneity in ASO distribution in the mouse tissues. Becquart et al. report absolute concentration of Antisense Oligonucleotide therapeutics in human hepatocytes. Their method built upon work in Thomen et al. where they reported the absolute concentration of the prodrug ^{13}C labeled L-dopa.

=== Materials science applications ===
The NanoSIMS has been used in many different areas of materials science. It is able to map hydrogen and deuterium at microstructurally relevant scales which is important for studies of hydrogen embrittlement in metals although there are significant challenges associated with accurately detecting hydrogen and deuterium.

== Methods commonly coupled with NanoSIMS ==
=== Microscopy ===
Other microscopy techniques are commonly used in tandem with NanoSIMS that allow for multiple types of information to be obtained, such as taxonomic information through fluorescence in situ hybridization (FISH) or identification of additional physiological or microstructural features via transmission electron microscopy (TEM) or scanning electron microscopy (SEM).

=== Immunogold labeling ===
Traditional methods that are used to label and identify subcellular features of cells, such as immunogold labeling, can also be used with NanoSIMS analysis. Immunogold labeling uses antibodies to target specific proteins, and subsequently labels the antibodies with gold nano particles. The NanoSIMS instrument can detect the gold particles, providing the location of the labelled proteins at a high scale resolution. Gold-containing or platinum-containing compounds used as anticancer drugs were imaged using NanoSIMS to examine the subcellular distribution in breast cancer and colon cancer cells, respectively. In a separate study, antibody-antigen binding was studied without the need for a fluorescent label to be added to the antibody, allowing for label-free localization and quantitative analysis at a high resolution.

=== Stable isotope labeling ===
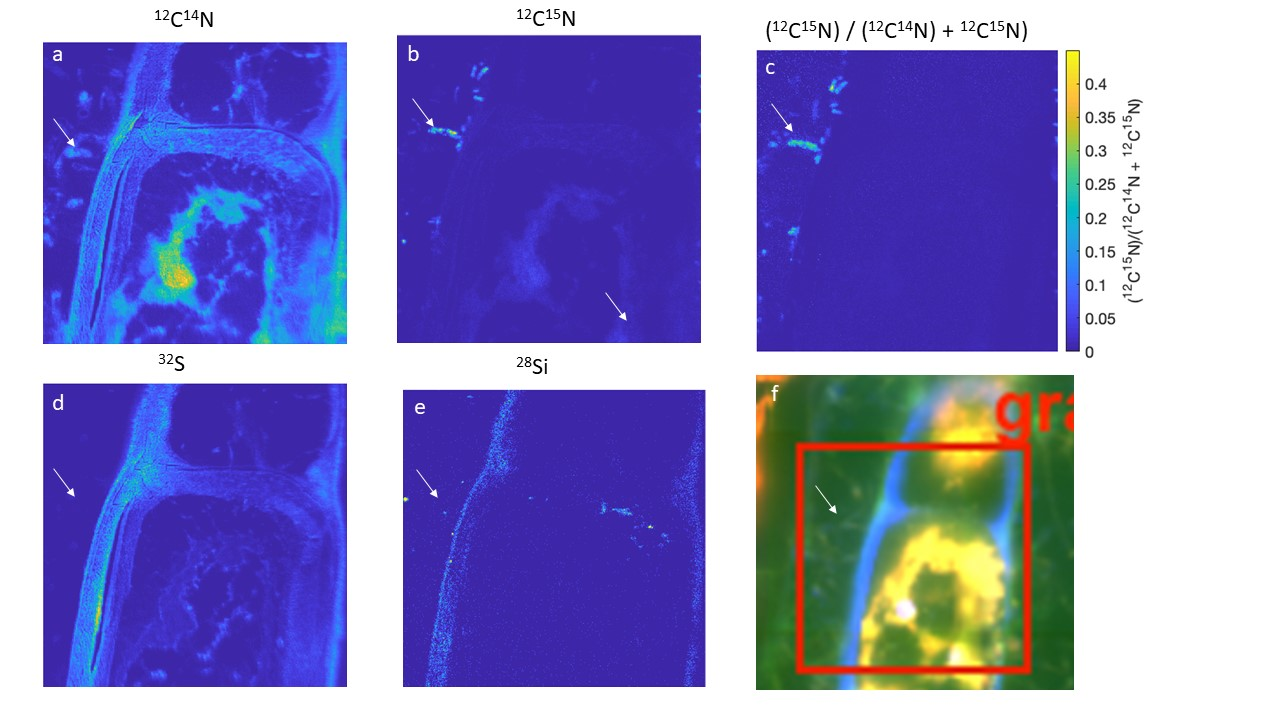
NanoSIMS analysis of a diatom and bacteria (white arrow) provided with stable isotope labeled ^{15}N nitrate. In panels a-e, dark blue represents low counts of each isotope, and yellow is high counts. The bacteria, but not the diatom, incorporated the heavy ^{15}N, as seen in panel c. The natural ^{15}N to ^{14}N ratio is 0.04. Any ratio above this indicates the organism incorporated the ^{15}N nitrate into their organic matter. The natural differences in ^{32}S abundance between the bacteria and diatom can also be seen (panel d), along with the ^{28}Si signal of the frustule of the diatom, made of silica (panel e). Panel f is a fluorescence of the same diatom. The red box indicates the same view seen in panels a-e. Each nanoSIMS image is 50 μm by 50 μm. Image provided by the International Geobiology Training Course and Orphan Lab, Caltech.

Another common technique typically used in NanoSIMS analysis is stable isotope probing. This method involves the introduction of stable isotopically labelled biologically relevant compounds to organisms for consumption and integration into organic matter. When analyzed via NanoSIMS, the technique is referred to as nanoSIP. NanoSIMS can be used to detect which organisms incorporated which molecules, how much of the labeled molecules was incorporated in a semi-quantitative manner, and where in the cell the incorporation occurred. Previous quantitative analysis techniques at a lower resolution than NanoSIMS of stable isotopically labeled molecules was limited to analyzed bulk material, which did not allow for insights about the contributions of individual cells or subcellular compartments to be made. Additionally, the removal of large foreign molecules (such as antibodies or gold particles) from the experimental setup alleviates concerns that tagged molecules required for other microscopy techniques may have different biochemical responses or properties than normal.

This technique can be used to study nutrient exchange. The mouse gut microbiome was investigated to determine which microbes fed on host-derived compounds. For this, mice were given food enriched in the stable isotopically labelled amino acids and the microbial biomass examined. NanoSIMS allows for the metabolic contributions of individual microbes to be examined. NanoSIMS was used to study and prove for the first time the nitrogen fixing abilities of bacteria and archaea from the deep ocean by supplying ^{15}N nitrogen contain compounds to sediment samples. NanoSIMS can also be used to estimate growth rate of organisms, as the amount of carbon or other substrate accumulated inside the cell allows for estimation of how much biomass is being generated.

=== Measuring natural isotope abundances in organisms ===
Organic material naturally contains stable isotopes at different ratios in the environment, which can provide information on the origin of the food source for the organisms. Different types of organic material of food sources has different amounts of stable isotopes, which is reflected in the composition of the organism that eats these food sources. This type of analysis was first used in 2001 in conjunction with FISH to examine syntrophic relationships between anaerobic methane-oxidizing archaea and sulfate reducing bacteria. Isotopes with naturally low abundances may not be able to be detected with this method.

=== Paleobiology ===
NanoSIMS can also be used to examine the elemental and isotopic composition of microparticles preserved in the rock record. The types of elements and isotopic ratios can help determine if the material is of biological origin. NanoSIMS was first used in this field of paleobiology in 2005 by Robert et al. In this study, microfossils were found to contain carbon, nitrogen, and sulfur elements arranged as ‘globules’ that were reminiscent of cell walls. The ratio of carbon to nitrogen measured also served as an indicator of biological origin, as the rock surrounding the fossils had very different C to N ratios.
