= S. Brooks McLane =

S. Brooks McLane (died January 13, 2000) was the electronic technician in the Field Emission Laboratory at Penn State who, with Gerald Fowler and J. A. Panitz was responsible for developing the Atom-Probe Field Ion Microscope. An electronics specialist who received an M.S. degree from the Texas School of Arts and Industries, he was Assistant Professor of Physics at Davidson College in 1957 and co-authored several scientific papers including "Field Absorption and desorption of helium and neon" that appeared in Surface Science in 1969. Between 1964 and 1986 he co-wrote 8 separate articles in his field that appeared in the American Institute of Physics' Review of Scientific Instruments.
