= HFC =

HFC may stand for:

== Businesses and organisations ==
=== Businesses ===
- High Field Consultants, an American atomic imaging company
- Home Finance Company, Ghana
- HFC Bank, part of HSBC Finance, United States

=== Government and military ===
- Home Front Command, Israel
- Hundred Flowers Campaign, China (1956–1957)
- House Freedom Caucus, in the US House of Representatives

== Football clubs ==
=== Australia ===
- Hawthorn Football Club, an Australian-rules club
- Heidelberg Football Club, an Australian-rules club

=== England ===
- Haughmond F.C.
- Hendon F.C.
- Hereford F.C.
- Histon F.C.
- Horsham F.C.
- Hull F.C., a rugby league club
- Hyde F.C.

=== Scotland ===
- Hanover F.C. (Edinburgh)
- Heart of Midlothian F.C. ("Hearts")
- Hibernian F.C.

=== Elsewhere ===
- Hanover F.C., Northern Ireland
- Heights F.C., Northern Ireland
- Hyderabad FC, India
- Hallescher FC, Germany
- Henan F.C., China
- Holywood F.C., Northern Ireland
- Koninklijke HFC, Netherlands

== Places ==
- Hall for Cornwall, a theatre in Cornwall, England
- Heng Fa Chuen, Hong Kong, China
  - Heng Fa Chuen station (by MTR station code)

== Science and technology ==
=== Chemicals ===
- Hafnium carbide
- Hydrofluorocarbons

=== Technologies ===
- High frequency content measure, of a signal
- Hybrid fiber-coaxial, a type of broadband network
- Hydrogen fuel cell, a type of vehicle power plant
