= Imago (disambiguation) =

An imago (pl. imagines – pl. imagoes) is the last stage of development of an insect.

Imago may also refer to:

== Art ==
- Imago, a Roman death mask
- Imago, a Roman military standard
- Imago dei, the image of God
- "Imago", a poem by Patti Smith in the book The Coral Sea (1996)

== Fiction ==
- Imago, a 1989 science fiction novel by Octavia E. Butler
- Imago (1970 film), an American film directed by Ned Bosnick
- Imago (2001 film), a French film directed by Marie Vermillard
- Imago (2016 film), a Philippine short drama film directed by Raymund Ribay Gutierrez
- Imago, a hidden feature in the video game Den-noh Coil

== Music ==
- Imago Records, an independent record label active in the early 1990s
- Imago (band), a Filipino pop rock band
- "Imago (Homines Partus)", a song by Pain of Salvation from BE (2004)
- "Imago", a song by The Mars Volta from Noctourniquet (2012)

=== Albums ===
- Imago, a 1999 album by Rovo
- Imago (2002 Catharsis album)
- Imago (2003 Catharsis album), the Russian version of the 2002 album
- Imago (The Butterfly Effect album), 2006

== Psychology ==
- American Imago, an academic journal founded in 1939 by Sigmund Freud and Hanns Sachs
- Imago Relationship Therapy (IRT), therapy practice concerning relationships
- Imago, a term coined by Carl Jung to describe a way that people form their personality by identifying with the collective unconscious

== Other uses ==
- Imago Scientific Instruments, American technology company
- Imago, a typeface designed by Günter Gerhard Lange in 1982

== See also ==
- Image (disambiguation)
- Imagon (disambiguation)
