= CAMECA =

French scientific instrument manufacturer

Cameca
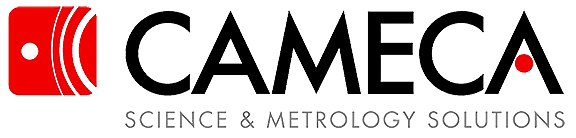
- Company type: Public
- Industry: scientific instruments
- Founded: 1929
- Headquarters: Gennevilliers, France
- Area served: Worldwide
- Website: cameca.com/

CAMECA is a manufacturer of scientific instruments, namely material analysis instruments based on charged particle beam, ions, or electrons.

== History ==
The company was founded as a subsidiary of Compagnie générale de la télégraphie sans fil (CSF), in 1929, as "Radio-cinéma" at the time of the emergence of the talkies. The job was to design and manufacture Movie projectors for big cinema screening rooms.

After World War II, spurred on by Maurice Ponte, director of CSF and a future member of the French Academy of Sciences, the company manufactured scientific instruments developed in French University laboratories: the Spark Spectrometer at the beginning of the 1950s, the Castaing Microprobe from 1958, and Secondary Ion Analysers from 1968. Also in the early 1950s the company settled the factory in Courbevoie, boulevard Saint-Denis where it remained for more than fifty years. The Spark Spectrometer was abandoned at the end of the 1950s.

The name of CAMECA, standing for Compagnie des Applications Mécaniques et Electroniques au Cinéma et à l'Atomistique, was given in 1954. The business of movie projectors stopped soon after 1960, but in the 1960s there was a short-lived revival of the film business through the adventure of the Scopitone.

Since 1977, the year that the IMS3F was launched, CAMECA has had a virtual monopoly in the field of magnetic SIMS, but it shares the market for Castaing microprobe with Japanese competitors, including Jeol. The semiconductor industry is a very important outlet for magnetic SIMS. At the end of the 20th century, CAMECA gained a foothold in a third analytical technique, tomographic atom probe.

In 1987, CAMECA left the Thomson-CSF group and was subject to a leveraged buyout by its management and employees. In 2001, the company was sold to a small French private equity fund, and then to another private equity fund controlled by the Carlyle Group, which sold CAMECA to Ametek, which merged CAMECA with Imago Scientific Instruments in 2010.

From 1975, the number of employees has been about 200. Subsidiaries were created in the United States, Japan, Korea, Taiwan and Germany. These subsidiaries engaged in commercial and maintenance activities and employ a few dozen people.

== The company in 2011 ==
According to the website of the company, in 2011 its business was in two different markets: scientific instruments dedicated to research activities; and metrology for the semiconductor industry. The latter market addresses semiconductor fabrication cleanrooms with a dedicated version of the Castaing electron probe based on the LEXES technique (low energy electron induced X-ray emission spectrometry) developed at the beginning of the 21st century.

CAMECA instruments are well known in academic communities, including the fields of geochemistry and planetary science, and CAMECA has been cited dozens of times in scientific journals such as Nature and Science.

In 2010, Ametek purchased the Wisconsin start-up Imago Scientific Instruments and attached it to CAMECA. CAMECA therefore holds the monopoly in the manufacturing of atom probe instruments with the LEAP brand name.
