= John A. Panitz =

John A. Panitz is Emeritus Professor of Physics at the University of New Mexico in Albuquerque. During his tenure at UNM he was Professor of Physics, Professor of High Technology Materials and Professor of Cell Biology and Physiology (in the School of Medicine). Professor Panitz developed the first laboratory courseware that encouraged both critical thinking and role playing in the structured environment of a cooperative learning group. Before joining UNM Professor Panitz was in the Surface Science Division at Sandia National Laboratory in Albuquerque where he patented the Field Desorption Spectrometer and the LiFE Detector. He is the founder and CEO of High Field Consultants and the owner and curator of Gallerie Imaginarium.

Professor Panitz developed the original atom probe with Erwin W. Muller and S. Brooks McLane and Gerry Fowler. He was a co-discoverer of the field-adsorption phenomenon. He introduced the 10-cm Atom-Probe, the Imaging Atom-Probe, and several other techniques. The 10-cm Atom Probe has been called the progenitor of later atom probe instruments including the commercial instruments available today.
