= MILMEGA =

- Industry: Communications testing, EMC, defence, medical devices, high energy physics research
- Founded: 1987
- Headquarters: Park Road Ryde Isle of Wight United Kingdom
- Key people: Pat Moore (Managing Director); Graeme Goodall (Finance Director); Mark Bloom (Design Engineering Manager); Mark Gane (Operations Manager)
- Number of employees: 28
- Website: milmega.co.uk

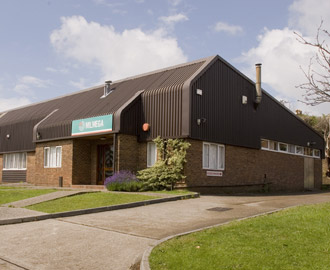
MILMEGA premises in the Isle of Wight

MILMEGA is a company specializing in designing and manufacturing high-power amplifiers for electromagnetic compatibility (EMC) testing. Headquartered in Ryde on the Isle of Wight in England, MILMEGA mainly provides broadband amplifier products with frequency ranges from 80 MHz to 8 GHz, with power levels from 30W - 1kW.

== History ==
Founded in 1987 by Dr John Yelland, MILMEGA's first design was a contract to deliver a narrow-band amplifier to meet the requirements of a medical product used in the treatment of prostate cancer.

MILMEGA went onto design and manufacture high-power amplifiers for commercial and government applications.

MILMEGA was first sold in 1997 to Thermo Voltek an American company.

In 2004, the company was acquired by its management team in a management buyout (MBO) in part financed by venture capital funding from South East Growth Fund.

Since the MBO the company has invested in the field of wide bandgap transistor technologies, specifically, silicon carbide transistor (SiC) and gallium nitride transistor (GaN) technologies.

In 2010, the company centralized its operations to Park Road, Ryde, on the Isle of Wight, and in the same year, launched its Chinese language website.

In February 2012, MILMEGA was purchased by Teseq Holding AG.

In April 2012, MILMEGA received the Queen's Awards for Enterprise for their 80 MHz to 1 GHz range of amplifier.

In January 2014, the Teseq Group was purchased by AMETEK Inc.

In June 2023, MILMEGA moved the Daish Way in Newport under AMETEK CTS as a manufacturing facility.

Today, MILMEGA's workforce consists of 35 design and production staff.
