= Powervar =

- Company type: Private
- Industry: Power protection systems
- Founded: 1986
- Headquarters: Waukegan, Illinois
- Products: UPS, power conditioners, ...
- Owner: Ametek

Powervar is an American company founded in 1986 by Peter Nystrom in Tustin, California which is now based in Waukegan, Illinois. Powervar manufactures power protection systems and equipment used in areas such as retail or medical industries. The company has presence in USA, Canada, Germany, UK, and the Middle East. In 2013 Powervar was acquired by AMETEK for $128 million. In that year the company had nearly $70 million in sales.

== Products ==
- Power Conditioners
- Single-phase UPS
- Three-phase UPS
- Mobile power managers for mobile medical carts
- Local area power centers, which includes a UPS system, MBS, and PDU
- Communication line protectors
- Other connectivity solutions
