= Gerald Fowler =

Gerald Fowler may refer to:

- Gerry Fowler (Gerald Teasdale Fowler), British Labour Party politician and university academic
- Gerald Fowler (cricketer), English cricketer
- Gerald Leroy Fowler. American scientific instrument maker
