= Alfred Benninghoven =

German scientist and mass spectrometrist

- Born: 18 February 1932; Frankfurt
- Died: 22 December 2017 (aged 85)
- Education: University of Paris; University of Cologne
- Known for: static secondary ion mass spectrometry
- Scientific career
- Fields: mass spectrometry
- Workplaces: University of Münster

Alfred Benninghoven (8 February 1932 in Frankfurt - 22 December 2017) was a German physicist and mass spectrometry researcher known for his work on static secondary ion mass spectrometry.

== Career and Research ==
Benninghoven graduated from the University of Cologne in 1961 where he worked with Fritz Kirchner (1896–1967) and completed his habilitation in surface physics in Cologne two years later. He first worked as professor in Cologne from 1965 to 1973 until he moved to a full professor position in experimental physics at the University of Münster in 1972. He worked on static secondary ion mass spectrometry (SIMS) and its applications, and developed SIMS instruments. In 1989 he co-founded IonTOF, a company that became a world-leader in TOF-SIMS instrumentation. He has written over 300 scientific articles and several books on the topic of SIMS, many of which have become reference works on SIMS.

For his work, he has received the Technology Transfer prize (German Ministry of Education and Research) and the 1984 Gaede-Langmuir Prize (American Vacuum Society) for the development of concepts and instrumentation in static secondary ion mass spectrometry and the demonstration of its usefulness in manifold applications. In 1990 he shared the Fritz-Pregl-Medaille of the Austrian Society of Analytical Chemistry with Wilhelm Simon. From 1977 to 1983, he was president of the German Vacuum Society (part of the German Physical Society).
