= Static secondary-ion mass spectrometry =

Mass spectrometric technique used to analyze the composition of solid surfaces

Static secondary-ion mass spectrometry, or static SIMS, is a secondary-ion mass spectrometry technique for chemical analysis including elemental composition and chemical structure of the uppermost atomic or molecular layer of a solid, which may be a metal, semiconductor, or plastic, with insignificant disturbance to its composition and structure. It is one of the two principal modes of operation of SIMS, which is the mass spectrometry of ionized particles emitted by a solid (or sometimes liquid) surface upon bombardment by energetic primary particles.

== Mechanism ==
Most of the energy of the primary ions is dissipated into the near-surface region of the solid by a series of binary collisions. This results in ejection (sputtering) of so-called "secondary" particles such as electrons, atoms, molecules, and ions from the surface. In SIMS, it is these secondary ions which are detected and analyzed by a mass spectrometer to produce a mass spectrum of a surface for a detailed chemical analysis of the surface or the solid.

The secondary-ion current is given by

$I_i^{\pm} = I_p f_i^{\pm} C_i S_i \eta_i,$

where ± refers to a positive or negative particle, I_{p} is the incident ion current, f^{±}_{i} is the fraction of particles sputtered as ions, S_{i} is the sputtering yield of both ions and neutrals, C_{i} is the concentration of the ith element (corrected for isotopic abundance) in the sputtered volume, η_{i} is the collection efficiency of the SIMS instrument, I_{p} = d^{2}j/4, d is the diameter of a Gaussian-shaped beam, and j is the current density.

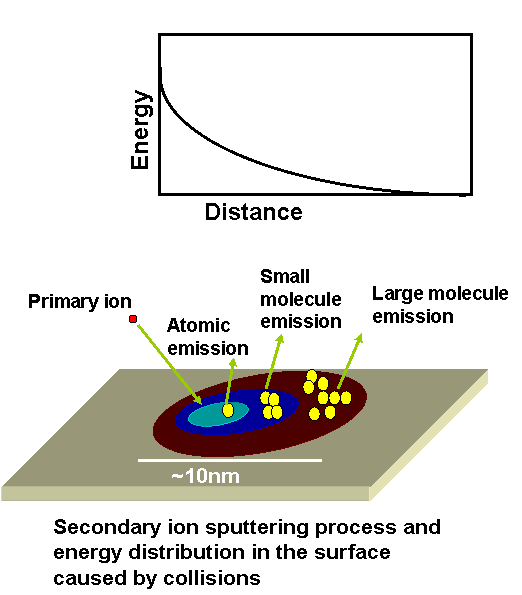

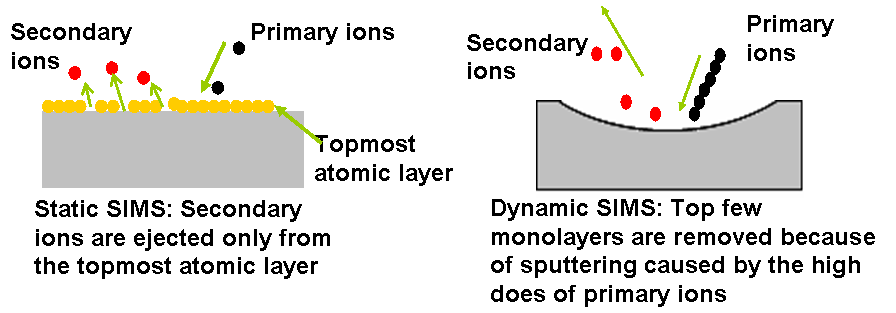

All the secondary ions generated in SIMS analysis originate from the topmost monolayers of the bombarded solid. This means that all different modes of SIMS analysis are basically surface analysis; secondary-ion emissions—atomic as well as molecular—reflect the chemical composition of the near-surface region of the bombarded solid. However, the intention of different SIMS analyses may be quite different. This depends on the erosion rate of the surface, which is controlled by the dose of the primary ions. It may be bulk analysis (dynamic SIMS) or a true analysis of originally uppermost monolayer of a condensed phase (static SIMS).

== Primary operating conditions ==
Ion bombardment of a surface may result in a drastic change of its chemical composition and structure. These changes include sputtering, amorphization, implantation, diffusion, chemical reactions, and so on. All these changes are limited to a small region surrounding the path of the primary ion into the solid. For static SIMS, each subsequent primary ion hits an undamaged area and a total of only 0.1-1% of the atomic sites are bombarded during the measurement. To ensure this, very low primary current densities are used, generally in the range of 10^{−10} to 10^{−9} A/cm^{2} (primary ion dose is below 10^{12} – 10^{13} ions/cm^{2}). This leads to extremely small sputtering rates of fraction of a monolayer per hour and hence small secondary-ion current density. Additionally, these emitted secondary ions are of low kinetic energy and emitted up to 20 nm from the impact site with surface annealing occurring in femtoseconds. These reasons make SSIMS a purely surface analysis technique causing negligible damage to the surface and with detection limits as low as 10^{−8} monolayer (ML).

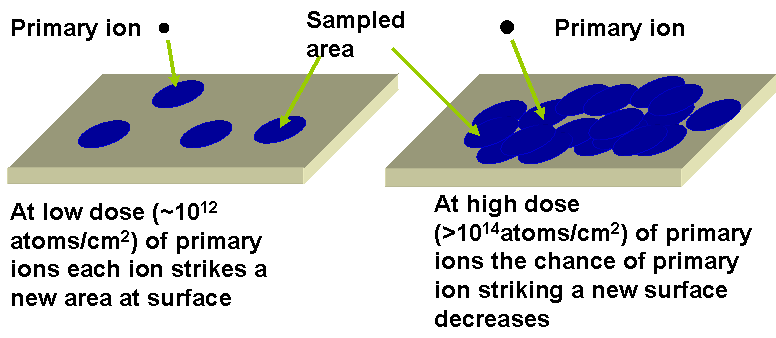

== Spectrum ==
The mass spectrum of the secondary ions emitted from the bombarded surface during SSIMS provides direct information of not only the chemical composition but also of the chemical structure of the bombarded area. This is because the mass spectrum includes cluster ions as well as elemental ions. These cluster ions reflect the surface chemistry in a detailed way. The figure shows the mass spectrum obtained from a SSIMS analysis of polytetrafluoroethylene (PTFE). The positive ion spectrum shows positive atomic ions (i.e. C^{+}) and molecular ions (i.e. CF^{+}, CF_{3}^{+}, C_{3}F_{3}^{+}) of the target. The negative ion spectrum shows negative atomic ions (i.e. F^{−}) and molecular ions (i.e. F_{2}^{−}, CF_{3}^{−}, C_{3}F_{3}^{−}).

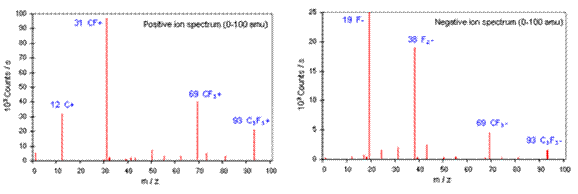
Static SIMS spectra from the surface of PTFE (polytetrafluoroethylene)

== History ==
Static SIMS was introduced by Benninghoven at the University of Münster in 1969. He applied the technique of SIMS to study surfaces in UHV by deliberately using low primary-ion currents covering large areas. Initially, most SSIMS was performed using quadrupole mass analyzers. However, in the mid-1980s, it was realized that time-of-flight mass spectrometers are more efficient for this mode of SIMS.

Compared to other surface techniques, such as Auger and photoelectron spectroscopy, SSIMS offers some unique features, including isotope sensitivity, hydrogen sensitivity, direct compound detection by molecular secondary-ion emission, and extremely high sensitivity, very often in the ppm range. However, one problem in static SIMS applications may be quantification. This problem can be overcome by using a combination of electron-spectroscopic techniques such as Auger electron spectroscopy (AES) and photoelectron spectroscopy (UPS or XPS) with static SIMS.

== Application in surface science ==
Static SIMS has been used in the investigation of the initial process of oxidation where only the first two or three metal layers participate in the oxidation.

Static SIMS gives a rigorous test of surface cleanliness, as it can detect species at ppm concentrations.

Static SIMS is used in the investigation of the nature of adsorption (molecular or dissociative). For example, dissociative adsorption of CO on a metal surface (M) is characterized by MC^{+}, MO^{+}, M2O^{+}, and M2C^{+} secondary ions (Fe and W), and molecular adsorption is identified by MCO+ and M2CO^{+} ions (Cu, Pd, Ni and Fe). Similarly, it also helps in the investigation of binding energies, chemical structure of the adsorbate, interaction between adsorbate molecules, and reactivity of adsorbate.

== Instrumentation ==
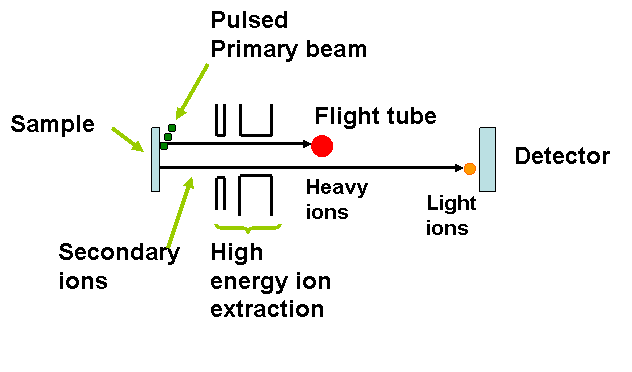
Basic principle of TOF SIMS

=== Vacuum systems ===
SSIMS experiments are performed in high vacuum for two reasons: first, to avoid scattering of the primary and secondary beams, and second, to prevent interfering adsorption of gases (i.e. oxygen) on the surface under investigation. For the first requirement, a pressure lower than 10^{−5} mbar is sufficient to ensure a mean free path that is long compared with the beam path. One monolayer of gas forms in 1 second at a pressure of 10^{−6} mbar. Thus for SSIMS analyses a pressure of ~ 10^{−10} mbar is needed to allow adequate time to complete the experiment.

=== Mass spectrometer ===
Quadrupole, magnetic sector, and time-of-flight (TOF) are the three mass spectrometers (MS) used in SIMS. For SSIMS, the primary requirement is low primary-ion flux density, which results in extremely low secondary ion yield (10^{−3} – 10^{−8} atoms/cm^{3}). Hence, there is a need to collect almost all the secondary ions. High transmission (0.5–1) of TOF maximizes the sensitivity (10^{4} times that of quadrupole MS). Parallel detection together with reasonable mass resolution and high mass range (m/z > 10^{3}) are among its other major advantages.

Ions are accelerated to a given potential so that they have the same kinetic energy, resulting in ions of different mass:charge (m/e) ratio having different velocities. These ions then pass through a region of field-free space in the flight tube, and spread out in time, with the higher-mass ions arriving later at the end of the flight tube, where a time-sensitive detection system produces a mass spectrum. The primary ions are pulsed into short bursts of less than 10 ns (the time scale of secondary-ion emission after impact is negligible (<10^{−12} s)). The primary beam is pulsed by a rapid deflection across a small aperture or by off-axis deflection, followed by a curved magnetic field to compress the pulse in space. There are very high accelerating fields at the sample (high extraction voltage and small (mm) extraction gaps) to reduce the initial energy spread of the secondary ions. Some TOF systems further compensate for this energy spread by using nonlinear flight tubes. One such design has a curved electrostatic path so that the more energetic ions are forced round the outer part of the bend. Another such design incorporates an electrostatic mirror in which the more energetic ions penetrate more deeply before reflection. In both designs, the faster ions have a longer flight path to offset their increased velocity, and all ions of the same mass arrive at the detector simultaneously.

=== Primary ion source ===
Three types of ion source are used for SSIMS: electron-impact ionization, surface ionization, or liquid-metal ion sources. In the electron-impact ion source, electrons from a heated filament (cathode) are accelerated towards an anode by a voltage difference where they ionize supply-gas atoms on impact. This source usually operates with noble gases. Typically, the energy is variable from 0.1–5 keV, allowing spot sizes from ~50 μm to several millimeters.

Surface ionization sources use Cs^{+} as the primary beam sources for TOF SIMS. Evaporation of caesium from a heated tungsten surface occurs both as atoms and ions. These ions are then accelerated away from the emitting surface. Since no collisions are involved, the ion beam is very pure, and since evaporation is by thermal means, the energy spread is very small, ~2kT (0.2 eV). The low energy spread and high intrinsic brightness of the ion sources offers the possibility of obtaining small spot sizes.

Liquid-metal ion sources draw a liquid metal (usually gallium or bismuth) from a heated reservoir over a tip (radius ≈5 μm) of a needle. An electrostatic field is produced at the tip by an extraction electrode biased negatively in front of the tip. Opposing electrostatic and surface-tension forces acting on the liquid film produce a conical shape with a high-radius-of-curvature cusp (≈2 μm) protruding from the tip. From this cusp field, ion emission occurs, by means of the process of field evaporation.
