= High Field Consultants =

High Field Consultants was founded in 1993 by J. A. Panitz to provide atom probe expertise to industry and academia. More specifically, they specialize in analysis, developing techniques from atom scale imaging, and high electric field phenomena investigation.

== Background ==
High-Field Consultants founder, J. A. Panitz, was the inventor of the Imaging Atom-Probe and the 10 cm Atom-Probe that are the progenitors of the commercial atom probes available today. The atom probe was introduced at the 14th Field Emission Symposium in 1967 by Erwin Wilhelm Müller and J. A. Panitz. It combined a field ion microscope with a mass spectrometer having a single particle detection capability and, for the first time, an instrument could “... determine the nature of one single atom seen on a metal surface and selected from neighboring atoms at the discretion of the observer”.

== Museum ==
High Field Consultants has created a museum to preserve the legacy of the Field Emission Microscope and its progenies, the Field Ion Microscope and the Atom-Probe. The Field Emission Microscope was introduced in 1936. It was the first microscope to achieve nanometer resolution. In 1951 its progeny; the Field Ion Microscope, was introduced and in 1956 it became the first microscope to image isolated atoms on a metal surface. In 1967 the Atom-Probe Field Ion Microscope was introduced and extended the capability of the microscope by determining the chemical identity of the imaged atoms. In 1973 the paradigm shifted away from the Field Ion Microscope with the introduction of the 10 cm Atom Probe. Patented and dubbed the Imaging Atom-Probe in 1975, it became the progenitor of future atom probes. Today, the Atom-Probe is a commercial tool in the arsenal of instruments used to develop new materials for technology and industry.

== Gallery ==
High Field Consultants has created a gallery of images from a vanishing technology that used a Field Ion Microscope made of pyrex glass, operated at high voltage (10-20 kV) and cooled with liquid hydrogen to 21K. An image was recorded on black and white astrophotography film (Kodak 103AG) using a Pentax 35mm camera equipped with an F0.87 (Super Farron) lens. Exposures of several minutes were required because the image was as dim as the Milky Way on a moonless night. The images were reproduced from 4x3 glass slides that Erwin Müller used in his talks and lectures. Several images were colorized but the image of tungsten is an optical color comparison made before computers had this capability. It was made by projecting a black and white image of tungsten before and after ion implantation through red and green filters, overlaying the images optically and recording the result on color film. Yellow atoms (red + green) indicate no change in atom position.
