= Imagon =

Imagon may refer to:

- Rodenstock Imagon, a soft-focus lens by Rodenstock also known as Tiefenbildner
- Imagon (drug), a trade name for the Chloroquine drug

== See also ==
- Imago (disambiguation)
- Imacon
