= Zygo Corporation =

Manufacturer

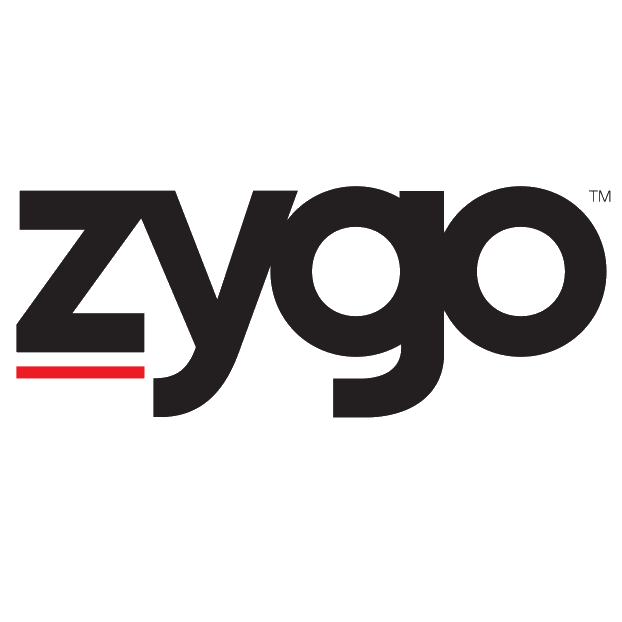
- Trade name: Zygo
- Type: Public
- Headquarters: Middlefield, Connecticut, United States
- Key people: Paul Forman, Carl Zanoni, Sol Laufer
- Parent: Ametek, Inc.
- Website: zygo.com

Zygo Corporation, or simply Zygo which is a manufacturer headquartered at Middlefield, Connecticut, specializes in optical systems and equipment. Their metrology product lines include 3D measuring microscopes using coherence scanning interferometry, laser Fizeau interferometers for testing optical components, laser displacement interferometers, and heterodyne optical encoders for stage position metrology. Zygo's optics business manufactures both optical assembly and custom optics for medical instruments and national labs. Over 750 patents have been awarded since the Company's founding.

== History and products ==
The company was founded in 1970 by Paul Forman, Carl Zanoni, and Sol Laufer, with financial support from Canon Inc. and Wesleyan University. An initial priority for the company was to build a world-class optical fabrication facility for producing optics with the highest precision plano surfaces and angles.

It was recognized that in order to achieve such a goal, practical and easy-to-use interferometry would have to be a standard part of the fabrication process. While there were several interferometers available on the market at that time, none had all the flexibility or features needed for Zygo's facilities and were also extremely cost-prohibitive. An interferometer was developed in 1972 for these in-house purposes, the Model GH, and it later became Zygo's first commercial product with a second model, the Mark II, being its breakout success in 1976.

In the 1990s, Zygo expanded its offerings to include software designed for lower cost personal computers and brought to market its ZMI metrology lasers.

In October 2008, competitor ESI attempted to acquire Zygo for approximately 174 million USD worth of stock but the buy-out was stymied by Zygo's board of directors. Zygo later became part of the Ultra Precision Technologies Division of Ametek, Inc. as a result of a 2014 acquisition.

In 2022, Zygo announced a further expansion into Europe with a new office location in Italy. With an established office in Germany along with a partner network across additional European countries, the Italy office will support Zygo's European customer base.

== Awards and accolades ==
Two researchers working received the Rudolf Kinglake Medal for their work while employed at Zygo in optical engineering in 2016.

In 2000, Zygo successfully sued Wyko Corp for patent infringement of a breadboard-based interferometer first registered by Zygo in 1978.
