= Land Instruments International =

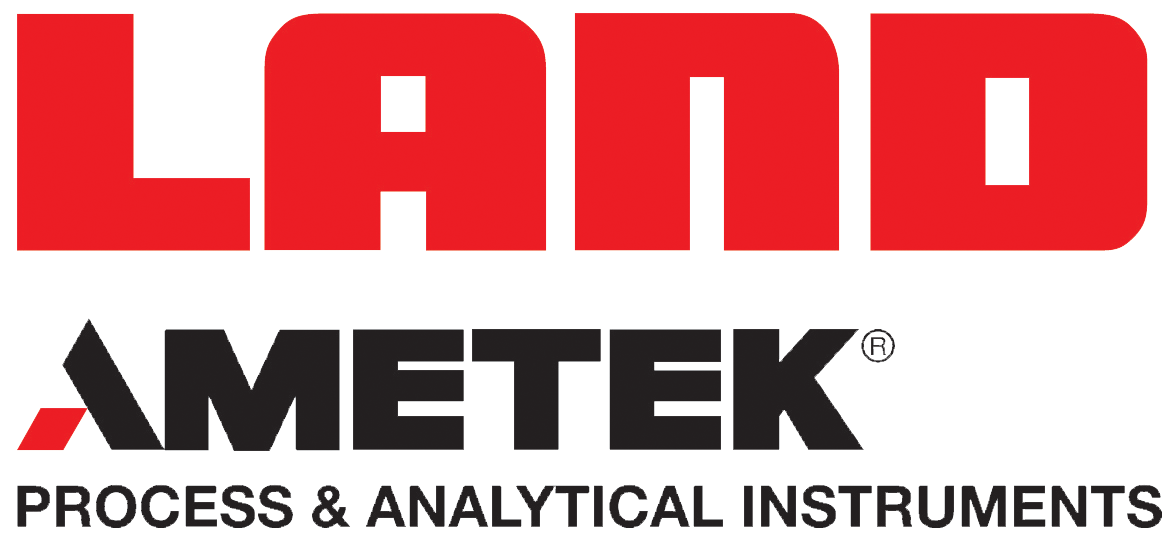
- Industry: Manufacturer
- Founded: Sheffield, United Kingdom (1947)
- Founder: Tom Land
- Headquarters: Dronfield, Derbyshire, United Kingdom
- Area served: Worldwide
- Key people: David Primhak
- Products: Infrared thermometers; Thermal Imagers; Infrared linescanners; Combustion Efficiency Monitors; Environmental Emissions Analysers
- Parent: Ametek, Inc.
- Website: www.ametek-land.com

Land Instruments International (AMETEK Land) is a manufacturer of industrial sensors and measuring devices founded in the UK in 1947. It was acquired by the Process & Analytical Instruments Division of Ametek in 2006.

== Products ==
- Fixed Spot Non-Contact Thermometers / Pyrometers
- Fixed Thermal Imagers and Line Scanners
- Portable Non-Contact Thermometers
- Portable Gas Analysers
- Opacity and Dust Monitors
- Carbon Monoxide Detectors

== Services ==
- Hazardous Area Certification
- On-Site Servicing
- Training
- Technical Support
- Certification and Calibration
- Global Service Centres
