= Secondary-ion mass spectrometry =

Surface chemical analysis and imaging method

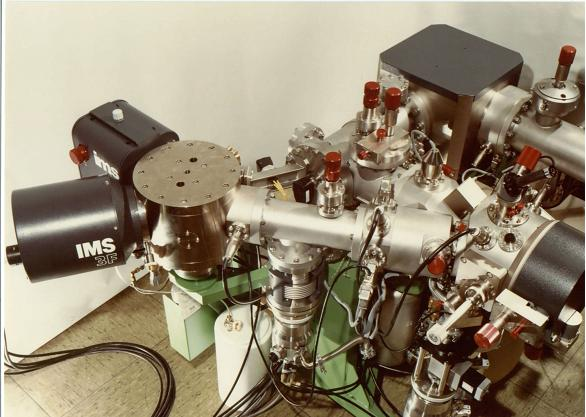
- Old magnetic sector SIMS, model IMS 3f, succeeded by the models 4f, 5f, 6f, 7f and most recently, 7f-Auto, launched in 2013 by the manufacturer CAMECA.
- Acronym: SIMS
- Classification: Mass spectrometry
- Analytes: Solid surfaces, thin films

Other techniques
- Related: Fast atom bombardment Microprobe

Secondary-ion mass spectrometry (SIMS) is a technique used to analyze the composition of solid surfaces and thin films by sputtering the surface of the specimen with a focused primary ion beam and collecting and analyzing ejected secondary ions. The mass/charge ratios of these secondary ions are measured with a mass spectrometer to determine the elemental, isotopic, or molecular composition of the surface to a depth of 1 to 2 nm. Due to the large variation in ionization probabilities among elements sputtered from different materials, comparison against well-calibrated standards is necessary to achieve accurate quantitative results. SIMS is the most sensitive elemental surface analysis technique, with elemental detection limits ranging from parts per million to parts per billion.

== History ==
In 1910, British physicist J. J. Thomson observed a release of positive ions and neutral atoms from a solid surface induced by ion bombardment. Improved vacuum pump technology in the 1940s enabled the first prototype experiments on SIMS by Herzog and Viehböck in 1949, at the University of Vienna, Austria. In the mid-1950s, Honig constructed a SIMS instrument at RCA Laboratories in Princeton, New Jersey. Then in the early 1960s, two SIMS instruments were developed independently. One was an American project, led by Liebel and Herzog, which was sponsored by NASA at GCA Corp, Massachusetts, for analyzing Moon rocks, and the other was at the University of Paris-Sud in Orsay by R. Castaing for the PhD thesis of G. Slodzian. These first instruments were based on a magnetic double-focusing sector field mass spectrometer and used argon for the primary-beam ions.

In the 1970s, K. Wittmaack and C. Magee developed SIMS instruments equipped with quadrupole mass analyzers. Around the same time, A. Benninghoven introduced the method of static SIMS, where the primary ion current density is so small that only a negligible fraction (typically 1%) of the first surface layer is necessary for surface analysis. Instruments of this type use pulsed primary ion sources and time-of-flight mass spectrometers and were developed by Benninghoven, Niehuis, and Steffens at the University of Münster, Germany and also by Charles Evans & Associates. The Castaing and Slodzian design was developed in the 1960s by the French company CAMECA S.A.S. and used in materials science and surface science. Recent developments are focusing on novel primary ion species like C_{60}^{+}, ionized clusters of gold and bismuth, or large gas-cluster ion beams (e.g., Ar_{700}^{+}). The sensitive high-resolution ion microprobe (SHRIMP) is a large-diameter, double-focusing SIMS sector instrument based on the Liebl and Herzog design, and produced by Australian Scientific Instruments in Canberra, Australia.

== Instrumentation ==
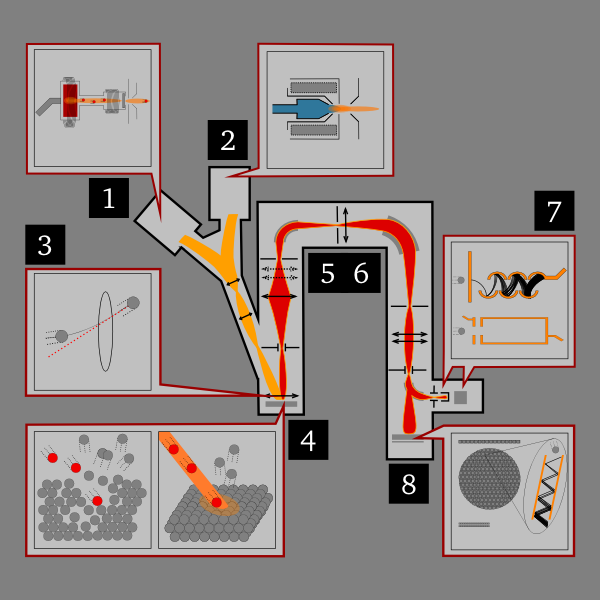
Schematic of a typical dynamic SIMS instrument. High energy (usually several keV) ions are supplied by an ion gun (1 or 2) and focused on to the target sample (3), which ionizes and sputters some atoms off the surface (4). These secondary ions are then collected by ion lenses (5) and filtered according to atomic mass (6), then projected onto an electron multiplier (7, top), Faraday cup (7, bottom), or CCD screen (8).

A secondary-ion mass spectrometer consists of (1) a primary ion gun generating the primary ion beam, (2) a primary ion column, accelerating and focusing the beam onto the sample (and in some devices an opportunity to separate the primary ion species by Wien filter or to pulse the beam), (3) high-vacuum sample chamber holding the sample and the secondary-ion extraction lens, (4) a mass analyzer separating the ions according to their mass-to-charge ratios, and (5) a detector.

=== Vacuum ===
SIMS requires a high vacuum with pressures below 10^{−4} Pa (roughly 10^{−6} mbar or torr). This is needed to ensure that secondary ions do not collide with background gases on their way to the detector (i.e., the mean free path of gas molecules within the detector must be large compared to the size of the instrument), and it also limits surface contamination by adsorption of background gas particles during measurement.

=== Primary ion source ===
Three types of ion guns are employed. In one, ions of gaseous elements are usually generated with duoplasmatrons or by electron ionization, for instance noble gases (^{40}Ar^{+}, Xe^{+}), oxygen (^{16}O^{−}, ^{16}O_{2}^{+}, ^{16}O_{2}^{−}), or even ionized molecules such as SF_{5}^{+} (generated from SF_{6}) or C_{60}^{+} (fullerene). This type of ion gun is easy to operate and generates roughly focused but high-current ion beams. A second source type, the surface ionization source, generates ^{133}Cs^{+} primary ions. Caesium atoms vaporize through a porous tungsten plug and are ionized during evaporation. Depending on the gun design, fine focus or high current can be obtained. A third source type, the liquid metal ion gun (LMIG), operates with metals or metallic alloys, which are liquid at room temperature or slightly above. The liquid metal covers a tungsten tip and emits ions under influence of an intense electric field. While a gallium source is able to operate with elemental gallium, recently developed sources for gold, indium, and bismuth use alloys which lower their melting points. The LMIG provides a tightly focused ion beam (<50 nm) with moderate intensity and is additionally able to generate short pulsed ion beams. It is therefore commonly used in static SIMS devices.

The choice of the ion species and ion gun respectively depends on the required current (pulsed or continuous), the required beam dimensions of the primary ion beam, and on the sample which is to be analyzed. Oxygen primary ions are often used to investigate electropositive elements due to an increase of the generation probability of positive secondary ions, while caesium primary ions often are used when electronegative elements are being investigated. For short pulsed ion beams in static SIMS, LMIGs are most often deployed for analysis; they can be combined with either an oxygen gun or a caesium gun during elemental depth profiling, or with a C_{60}^{+} or gas-cluster ion source during molecular depth profiling.

=== Mass analyzer ===
Depending on the SIMS type, there are three basic analyzers available: sector, quadrupole, and time-of-flight. A sector field mass spectrometer uses a combination of an electrostatic analyzer and a magnetic analyzer to separate the secondary ions by their mass-to-charge ratio. A quadrupole mass analyzer separates the masses by resonant electric fields, which allow only the selected masses to pass through. The time-of-flight mass analyzer separates the ions in a field-free drift path according to their velocity. Since all ions possess the same kinetic energy the velocity and therefore time of flight varies according to mass. It requires pulsed secondary-ion generation using either a pulsed primary ion gun or a pulsed secondary-ion extraction. It is the only analyzer type able to detect all generated secondary ions simultaneously, and is the standard analyzer for static SIMS instruments.

=== Detector ===
A Faraday cup measures the ion current hitting a metal cup, and is sometimes used for high-current secondary-ion signals. With an electron multiplier, an impact of a single ion starts off an electron cascade, resulting in a pulse of 10^{8} electrons, which is recorded directly. A microchannel plate detector is similar to an electron multiplier, with lower amplification factor but with the advantage of laterally-resolved detection. Usually it is combined with a fluorescent screen, and signals are recorded either with a CCD-camera or with a fluorescence detector.

== Detection limits and sample degradation ==
Detection limits for most trace elements are between 10^{12} and 10^{16} atoms per cubic centimetre, depending on the type of instrumentation used, the primary ion beam used, the analytical area, and other factors. Samples as small as individual pollen grains and microfossils can yield results by this technique.

The amount of surface cratering created by the process depends on the current (pulsed or continuous) and dimensions of the primary ion beam. While only charged secondary ions emitted from the material surface through the sputtering process are used to analyze the chemical composition of the material, these represent a small fraction of the particles emitted from the sample.

== Static and dynamic modes ==
In the field of surface analysis, it is usual to distinguish static SIMS and dynamic SIMS. Static SIMS is the process involved in surface atomic monolayer analysis, or surface molecular analysis, usually with a pulsed ion beam and a time-of-flight mass spectrometer, while dynamic SIMS is the process involved in bulk analysis, closely related to the sputtering process, using a DC primary ion beam and a magnetic sector or quadrupole mass spectrometer.

Dynamic secondary-ion mass spectrometry (DSIMS) is a powerful tool for characterizing surfaces, including the elemental, molecular, and isotopic composition and can be used to study the structure of thin films, the composition of polymers, and the surface chemistry of catalysts. DSIMS was developed by John B. Fenn and Koichi Tanaka in the early 1980s. DSIMS is mainly used by the semiconductor industry.

== Applications ==
The COSIMA instrument onboard Rosetta was the first instrument to determine the composition of cometary dust in situ with secondary-ion mass spectrometry during the spacecraft's 2014–2016 close approaches to comet 67P/Churyumov–Gerasimenko.

SIMS is used for quality assurance purposes in the semiconductor industry and for the characterization of natural samples from this planet and others. More recently, this technique is being applied to nuclear forensics, and a nanoscale version of SIMS, termed NanoSIMS, has been applied to pharmaceutical research.

SIMS can be used in the forensics field to develop fingerprints. Since SIMS is a vacuum-based method, it is necessary to determine the order of usage along with other methods of analysis for fingerprints. This is because the mass of the fingerprint significantly decreases after exposure to vacuum conditions.

== See also ==
- NanoSIMS

== General bibliography ==
- Benninghoven, A., Rüdenauer, F. G., Werner, H. W., Secondary Ion Mass Spectrometry: Basic Concepts, Instrumental Aspects, Applications, and Trends, Wiley, New York, 1987 (1227 pages), ISBN 0-471-51945-6
- Vickerman, J. C., Brown, A., Reed, N. M., Secondary Ion Mass Spectrometry: Principles and Applications, Clarendon Press, Oxford, 1989 (341 pages), ISBN 0-19-855625-X
- Wilson, R. G., Stevie, F. A., Magee, C. W., Secondary Ion Mass Spectrometry: A Practical Handbook for Depth Profiling and Bulk Impurity Analysis, John Wiley & Sons, New York, 1989, ISBN 0-471-51945-6
- Vickerman, J. C., Briggs, D., ToF-SIMS: Surface Analysis by Mass Spectrometry, IM Publications, Chichester UK and SurfaceSpectra, Manchester, UK, 2001 (789 pages), ISBN 1-901019-03-9
- Bubert, H., Jenett, H., Surface and Thin Film Analysis: A Compendium of Principles, Instrumentation, and Applications, pp. 86–121, Wiley-VCH, Weinheim, Germany, 2002, ISBN 3-527-30458-4
