= Imago Scientific Instruments =

American technology company

- Type: Private
- Industry: Scientific instruments
- Founded: 1998
- Founder: Tom Kelly
- Fate: Acquired by Ametek and merged with CAMECA in 2010
- Headquarters: Madison, Wisconsin, United States
- Products: Local Electrode Atom Probe (LEAP)
- Parent: Ametek

Imago Scientific Instruments was a company founded in 1998 by Dr. Tom Kelly, a former professor in the Department of Materials Science and Engineering at the University of Wisconsin–Madison. At that time he was the Director of the Materials Science Center at the University of Wisconsin–Madison, but left his tenured position in 2001 to guide the company's growth.

Imago commercialized the Local Electrode Atom Probe (LEAP), providing a new type of atom probe microscope which is literally orders of magnitude faster in many performance criteria than any other recently delivered atom probe microscope. Imago (name comes from the Latin word for image or picture) has not only improved the instrumentation available for atom probe tomography, but has also developed many sample preparation techniques that are key enablers for the 3D sub-nanometer compositional information that the microscope provides.

The first commercial LEAP instrument, manufactured by Imago Scientific Instruments, was sold to Oak Ridge National Laboratory in 2002. It is now on display in the lobby of Osmond Laboratory at Pennsylvania State University, near the office of Erwin Wilhelm Müller, where the field ion microscope and the atom probe were originally developed.

In April 2010 Imago was purchased by Ametek [AME-NYSE], which is also the parent of CAMECA. The company was merged with CAMECA as part of Ametek's Materials Analysis Division.
