= Teseq =

Teseq AG
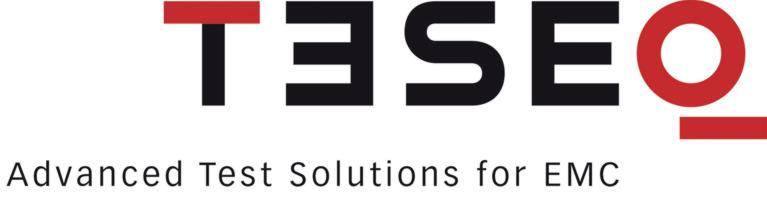
- Founded: 27. November 2006
- Founder: Johannes Schmid (Dr. Hans Schaffner, 1962)
- Headquarters: Luterbach, canton of Solothurn, Switzerland
- Key people: Johannes Schmid, President & CEO
- Products: Test & Measurement, EMC
- Website: www.teseq.com

Teseq AG, formerly Schaffner Test Systems is a supplier of Electromagnetic compatibility (EMC) test equipment and test systems. They develop and manufacture instruments for EMC emissions and immunity testing both for radiated and conducted emissions and immunity. Teseq operates ISO 17025 accredited calibration laboratories with EMC specialization.

Teseq was twice nominated for Best in Test by Test & Measurement World Magazine and has been awarded A2LA certification.

Teseq, formerly Schaffner Test Systems was the first company to recognize the threat of EMC emissions and interference and begin offering EMC instruments.

== History of Teseq AG ==
1962: Schaffner Switzerland established by Dr. Hans Schaffner
1971: First EMC test instrument launched
1981: First electrostatic discharge (ESD) generator released
1975–1990: Expansion to France, US, Singapore, Japan and China
1998: Acquisition of Chase EMC Ltd., Capel, UK
1999: Acquisition of MEB Messelektronik Berlin GmbH
2006: Management buy-out and establishment of the new Teseq company as an AG (Aktiengesellschaft)
2012: Acquisition of MILMEGA and IFI
