= Gerald Leroy Fowler =

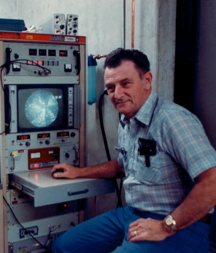
Gerald Leroy Fowler (1976).

Gerald Leroy Fowler was a veteran of World War II, the lead technician in the Field Emission laboratory at the Pennsylvania State University and was a master technician in the Surface Science division at Sandia National Laboratories in Albuquerque, New Mexico. He was the author or co-authored of nine technical publications in refereed journals.

== Life ==
Gerald Leroy Fowler was a veteran of World War II, serving with the 1570th Engineering Heavy Shop Company and the 562nd Engineering Boat Maintenance Battalion. He received the Philippines Liberation Ribbon with one Bronze Star, the Asiatic-Pacific Campaign Medal with 2 Bronze Stars, and the World War II Victory Medal.

At the end of World War II "Gerry" was hired by Erwin Müller as the lead technician in the Field Emission laboratory at the Pennsylvania State University where he designed and constructed scientific instruments and helped to educate a cadre of undergraduate and graduate physics students. He was instrumental in the design and construction of the atom probe and was recognized for his contribution in the first atom probe publication.

Gerry retired from Penn State in 1975 and was immediately hired in the Surface Science division at Sandia National Laboratories in Albuquerque, New Mexico where he published several technical papers and received the “Department 1110 Technical Excellence Award” from Sandia National Laboratories in May 1990 and the “Outstanding Lifetime Contribution” award for Vacuum Science and Technology from the New Mexico Chapter of the American Vacuum Society in April 1994. Jerry received the 1988 Shop Note of the Year Award from the Journal of Vacuum Science and Technology for his publication “Coaxial helium Leak detection Probe”. He retired from Sandia in 1994. In 1995 Gerry published his autobiography: My Little Corner of the World.

Fowler was a Charter Member of New Mexico Military Vehicle Preservation Association - Roadrunner Convoy in Albuquerque and the proud owner of “Henrietta” (an original military jeep) that he exhibited in parades and veteran events in New Mexico and Pennsylvania. Gerry died peacefully on October 21, 2010, at the age of 81.
