= Spectral centroid =

Measure used in digital signal processing

The spectral centroid is a measure used in digital signal processing to characterise a spectrum. It indicates where the center of mass of the spectrum is located. Perceptually, it has a robust connection with the impression of brightness of a sound. It is sometimes called center of spectral mass.

== Calculation ==
It is calculated as the weighted mean of the frequencies present in the signal, determined using a Fourier transform, with their magnitudes as the weights:

$$\text{centroid} = \frac{
\sum_{n=0}^{N-1}
f(n) x(n)
} {
\sum_{n=0}^{N-1}
x(n)
},$$

where x(n) represents the weighted frequency value, or magnitude, of bin number n, and f(n) represents the center frequency of that bin.

== Alternative usage ==
Some people use "spectral centroid" to refer to the median of the spectrum. This is a different statistic, the difference being essentially the same as the difference between the unweighted median and mean statistics. Since both are measures of central tendency, in some situations they will exhibit some similarity of behaviour. But since typical audio spectra are not normally distributed, the two measures will often give strongly different values. Grey and Gordon in 1978 found the mean a better fit than the median.

== Applications ==
Because the spectral centroid is a good predictor of the "brightness" of a sound, it is widely used in digital audio and music processing as an automatic measure of musical timbre.
