= Ametek =

American manufacturing company

AMETEK, Inc.
- Type: Public
- Traded as: NYSE: AME; S&P 500 component
- ISIN: US0311001004
- Industry: Conglomerate
- Founded: 1930; 96 years ago (as American Machine and Metals)
- Headquarters: Berwyn, Pennsylvania, U.S.
- Area served: Worldwide
- Key people: David A. Zapico (Chairman and CEO)
- Products: Electronic instruments Electromechanical devices
- Revenue: ▲US$6.94 billion (2024)
- Operating income: ▲US$1.78 billion (2024)
- Net income: ▲US$1.38 billion (2024)
- Total assets: ▼US$14.6 billion (2024)
- Total equity: ▲US$9.66 billion (2024)
- Number of employees: 21,500 (2024)
- Subsidiaries: Taylor Hobson
- Website: ametek.com

AMETEK, Inc. is an American multinational conglomerate and global designer and manufacturer of electronic instruments and electromechanical devices with headquarters in the United States and over 150 sites worldwide.

The company was founded in 1930. The company's original name, American Machine and Metals, was changed to AMETEK in the early 1960s, reflecting its evolution from a provider of heavy machinery to a manufacturer of analytical instruments, precision components and specialty materials.

AMETEK has been ranked as high as 402 on the Fortune 500. The firm has also consistently been on the Fortune 1000 rankings list as well as the Fortune Global 2000.

The overall strategy for the organization is made up of 4 components: Operational Excellence (cost control), New Product Development, International/Market Expansion, and Acquisitions.

The firm has two operating groups (the Electronic Instruments Group and the Electromechanical Group). Together, these groups and their divisions comprise over 100 brands, including analytical instruments, monitoring, testing and calibration devices as well as electrical motors, pumps and interconnects. The company's headquarters is in Berwyn, Pennsylvania.

AMETEK is listed on the New York Stock Exchange. Its common stock is a component of the S&P 500 index and the Russell 1000 index.

Ametek at 9th Bengaluru Space Expo 2026, BIEC

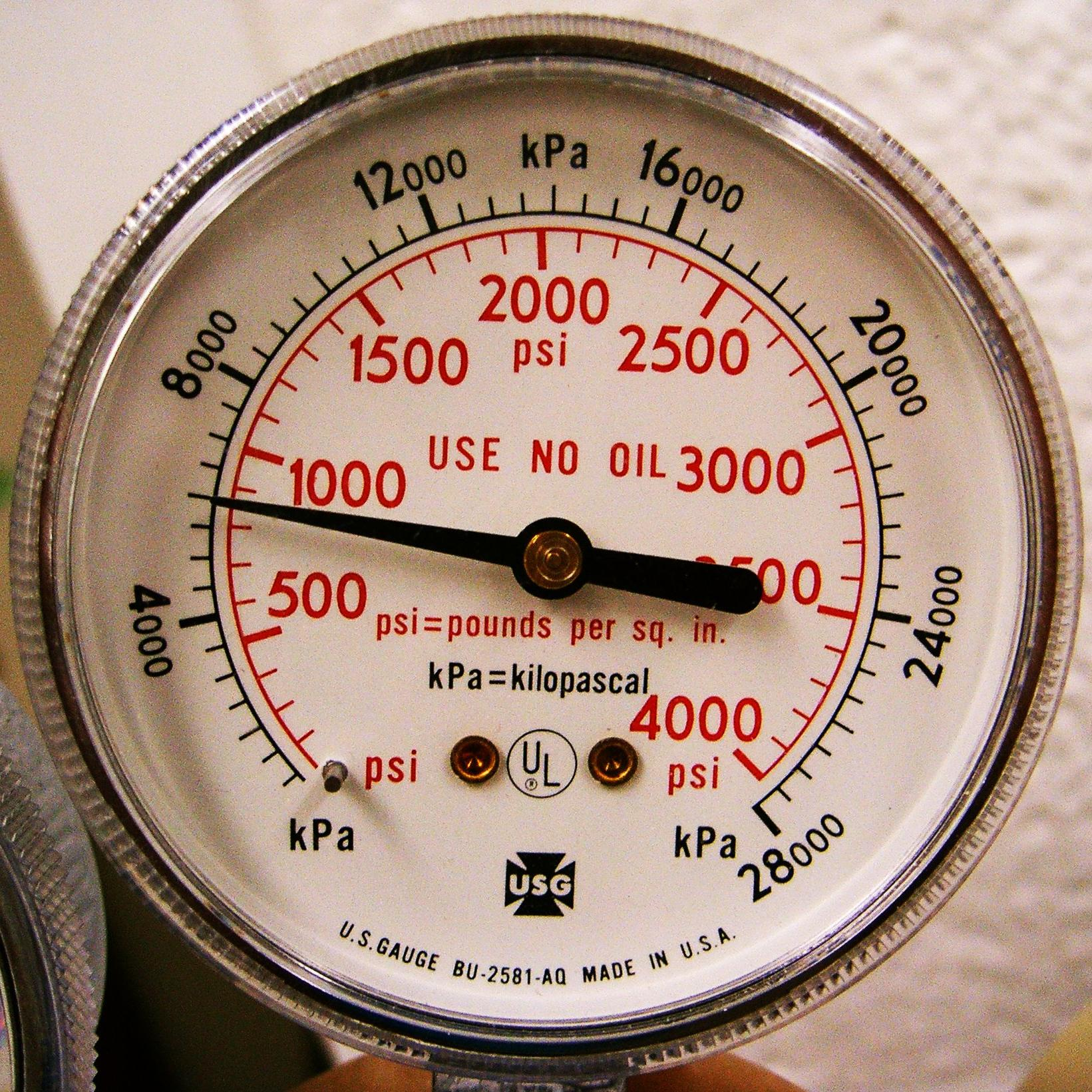
An AMETEK USG Pressure Gauge Device, made by AMETEK's gauge division

== Acquisition history ==
History prior to 1999 is incomplete.

Acquisition Date	Company name	Business
Jan 12, 1998	Rotron Inc.	Aerospace motors, fans and blowers
May 3, 1999	Gulton-Statham	High-accuracy electronic pressure transmitters and transducers
Aug 2, 1999	Patriot Sensors & Controls Corp.	Position sensors, aviation sensors and tank-level gauges
Dec 3, 1999	Drexelbrook Engineering	Point and continuous level measurement
May 21, 2001	GS Electric	Universal and permanent magnet motors
Jul 9, 2001	Edax Inc.	Analytic instrumentation
Mar 5, 2003	Solidstate Controls Inc.	Uninterruptible power supply systems
Sep 8, 2003	Chandler Engineering and Grabner Instruments	Drilling, production enhancement, & fuels analysis instruments
Jun 21, 2004	Taylor Hobson Holdings Ltd	Ultra-precision measurement instrumentation
Jul 19, 2004	Hughes-Treitler Manufacturing Corp.	Heat exchangers and thermal management subsystems
Jun 14, 2005	Spectro Beteiligungs (Spectro Analytical Instruments GmbH & Co)	Atomic spectroscopy instrumentation
Jun 21, 2005	Xtreme Energy	Patented technology for brushless DC micro-motors
Sep 7, 2005	Quizix Inc.	Precision pumping systems
Sep 26, 2005	Solartron	Analytical instruments
Oct 10, 2005	HCC Industries	Highly engineered hermetic connectors
Feb 16, 2006	Pulsar Technologies Inc	Specialized communications equipment
May 15, 2006	PennEngineering Motion Technologies	Motion-technology
Jun 15, 2006	Land Instruments International	Infrared temperature measurement, combustion-efficiency and emissions-monitoring
Sep 28, 2006	General Ceramics	Hermetic microelectronic packages
Nov 6, 2006	Precitech	Ultra-precision machining systems
Jun 5, 2007	Advanced Industries Inc.	Starter generators
Jun 5, 2007	B&S Aircraft Parts & Accessories	Jet overhaul services
Jun 20, 2007	Hamilton Precision Metals Inc.	Precision metal strip
Aug 13, 2007	Cameca SAS	Secondary Ion Mass Spectrometry (SIMS), Atom Probe Tomography (APT), shielded Electron Probe Micro Analysis (EPMA)
Dec 14, 2007	California Instruments	Programmable power
Feb 11, 2008	Newage Testing	Testing equipment
Feb 21, 2008	Drake Air	Heat-transfer repair services
Feb 26, 2008	Motion Control Group	Customized motors and motion control products
Apr 14, 2008	Reading Alloys	Niche specialty metals
Jun 12, 2008	Vision Research	High-speed digital imaging systems
Aug 25, 2008	Xantrex Technology Inc.	Programmable power
Nov 3, 2008	Muirhead Aerospace	Aerospace and defense
Jan 20, 2009	High Standard Aviation	Electrical/electromechanical, hydraulic and pneumatic repair services
Sep 28, 2009	Unispec Marketing Pvt. Ltd.	Affiliated businesses
Sep 28, 2009	Thelsha Technical Services Pvt. Ltd	Affiliated businesses
Jan 26, 2010	Sterling Ultra Precision	Machine tools for the ophthalmic lens
April 8, 2010	Imago Scientific Instruments	3D atom probes
June 1, 2010	Technical Services for Electronics	Engineered interconnect solutions
July 1, 2010	Haydon Enterprises	High-precision motion control products
Aug 19, 2010	American Reliance's Power Division	Direct current power supplies and electronic loads
Nov 9, 2010	Atlas Material Testing Technology	Weathering test instruments
April 28, 2011	Avicenna Technology, Inc	Medical device industry
May 9, 2011	Coining Holding Company	Metal preforms, microstampings and bonding wire solutions
Oct 17, 2011	Reichert Technologies	Eye care
Oct 25, 2011	EM Test GmbH	Electronic test and measurement equipment
Jan 3, 2012	Technical Manufacturing Corporation	Vibration isolation systems and optical test benches
Jan 26, 2012	O'Brien Corporation	Fluid and gas handling solutions
May 21, 2012	Dunkermotoren GmbH	Advanced motion control solutions
Oct 23, 2012	Micro-Poise Measurement Systems	Integrated test and measurement solutions for the tire industry
Dec 17, 2012	Aero Components International	Aviation repair operations
Dec 17, 2012	Avtech Avionics and Instruments	Aviation repair operations
Jan 2, 2013	Sunpower, Inc	Stirling cycle cryocoolers and externally heated stirling engine technology
Jan 2, 2013	Crystal Engineering	Pressure calibrators and digital test gauges
Aug 7, 2013	Controls Southeast, Inc.	Custom-engineered thermal solutions
Oct 29, 2013	Creaform (3D)	Portable 3D measurement technologies
Dec 4, 2013	Powervar	Power management systems and uninterruptible power supply (UPS) systems
Jan 3, 2014	Teseq Group	Test and measurement instrumentation for electromagnetic compatibility (EMC) testing
Feb 10, 2014	VTI Instruments	High precision test and measurement instrumentation
June 20, 2014	Zygo Corporation	Non-contact optical metrology
Aug. 5, 2014	AMPTEK, Inc.	X-ray detectors using x-ray fluorescence (XRF)
Aug. 5, 2014	Luphos GmbH	Non-contact metrology technology
May 8, 2015	Global Tubes	Small-diameter precision tubing
July 7, 2015	Surface Inspection Systems Division, Cognex Corp.	Vision systems for surface flaw and defect detection
Nov 1, 2016	Laserage Technology Corporation	Laser fabrication for medical device market
Aug 4, 2016	Nu Instruments	High-end elemental analysis
Aug 4, 2016	HS Foils	Materials analysis
Feb 5, 2016	Brookfield Engineering	Laboratory viscosity and rheology instruments
Feb 5, 2016	ESP/SurgeX	Power protection
Feb 7, 2017	Rauland-Borg Corporation	Healthcare communications solutions
April 17, 2017	MOCON, Inc.	Laboratory and field gas analysis instrumentation
December 19, 2017	Arizona Instrument	Laboratory moisture analysis and field toxic gas analyzers
January 19, 2018	FMH Aerospace	Aerospace components
April 9, 2018	SoundCom Systems	Communication solutions integration
November 1, 2018	Forza Silicon	Imaging Sensors
November 1, 2018	Telular	Communication Solutions
November 27, 2018	Spectro Scientific	Fluid Analysis Instrumentation for evaluating machine and lubricant condition in the field
September 4, 2019	Pacific Design Technologies	Thermal Management Solutions
September 27, 2019	Gatan, Inc.	Electron microscope instrumentation and software
February 5, 2020	IntelliPower	Uninterruptible power systems
March 29, 2021	Magnetrol International	Flow measurement
March 29, 2021	Crank Software	Digitally enabled devices
March 29, 2021	EGS Automation (EGS)	Automation
April 29, 2021	Abaco Systems	Embedded computing
May 4, 2021	NSI-MI	Radio Frequency and Microwave test and measurement solutions
December 1, 2021	Alphasense	Gas and particulate sensors
November 1, 2022	Navitar	Advanced Optical Components
November 1, 2022	RTDS Technologies	Power Simulation Systems
May 2, 2023	Bison Gear & Engineering	Motion Control Solutions
September 6, 2023	United Electronic Industries	Data Acquisition and Control Solutions
October 31, 2023	Paragon Medical	Highly engineered medical components and instruments
October 31, 2023	Amplifier Research Corp	Radio frequency (RF) and microwave amplifiers and electromagnetic compatibility (EMC) testing equipment
October 31, 2024	Virtek Vision International	Advanced laser-based projection and inspection systems
February 4, 2025	Kern Microtechnik	High-precision machining and optical inspection solutions
July 21, 2025	FARO Technologies	3D measurement and imaging solutions
Feb 3, 2026	LKC Technologies	Visual electrophysiology measurement solutions (e.g., ERG and VEP)

== Divisions ==
Abaco Systems

Rugged embedded electronics used in various industries.

Aerospace & Defense

Engine and avionics. Other aviation products and components.

=== Creaform ===
Creaform manufactures metrology and 3D engineering devices for use in shop-floor environments It is based in Lévis, Quebec, Canada. The company was founded in 2002 by Martin Lamontagne and two co-workers at Modelex. It began with a $200,000 loan from the Business Development Bank of Canada. In 2009, the company sold its 1000th laser scanner, priced from $50 –100,000. Creaform was acquired by Ametek in 2013 for $120 million in cash. At the time, Creaform had annual sales of $52 million. In 2017, Creaform opened a new, $20 million, headquarters in Levis. The 76,000 square foot headquarters is double the size of the old one, allowing Creaform to triple its production.

Heavy Vehicle and OEM

Motors, blowers, pumps, and other parts for heavy trucks and vehicles.

Materials Analysis and Imaging

Includes imaging products used in TV and movie production and tools such as Ion Mass spectrometers, electron Probe Microanalysis, Low-energy electron induced X-ray emission spectrometry, and atom Probe tomography.

Rauland

Healthcare (hospitals) and Education (schools) communication systems.

Oil & Gas / Power

Products for use in refineries and labs. Includes process analyzers, fuel analyzers, sample conditioning and heated and jacketed tubing.

== Financial Information ==
According to Ametek's website, the company had $7.5 billion in annualized sales as of Q4 2025.

Year	Revenue	Net Income
2024	$6.94B	$1.37B
2023	$6.59B	$1.31B
2022	$6.1B	$1.16B
2021	$5.54B	$990mm
2020	$4.54B	$872mm
2019	$5.15B	$861mm
2018	$4.84B	$777mm
2017	$4.3B	$681mm
2016	$3.84B	$512mm
2015	$3.97B	$590mm
2014	$4.02B	$584mm
2013	$3.59B	$516mm
